= Kaltenbrunnen railway station =

Railway station in Vorarlberg, Austria

Kaltenbrunnen
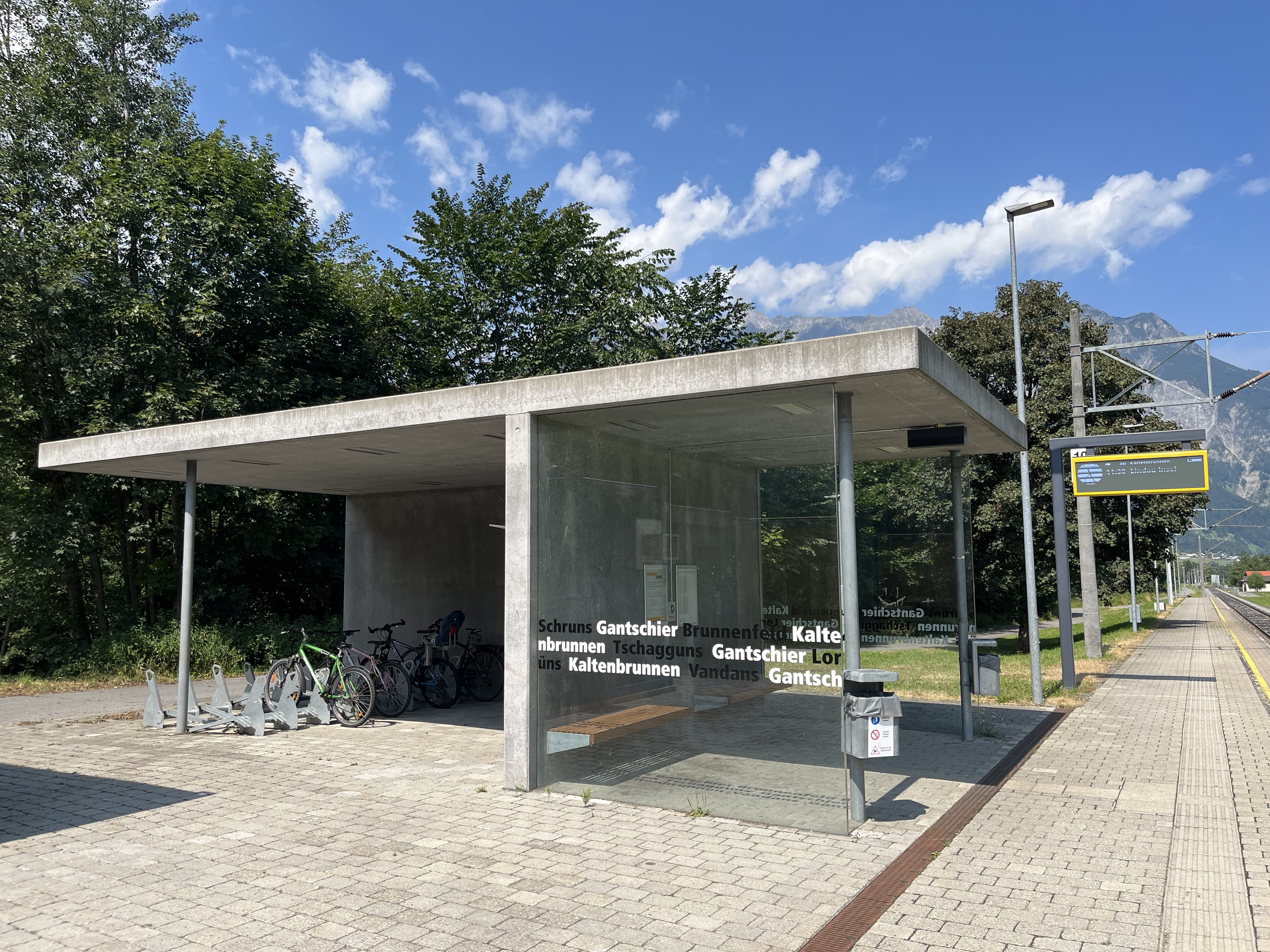

General information
- Location: Rodunder Straße; 6780 Schruns; Austria
- Coordinates: 47°05′7.5732″N 09°53′16.17″E
- Owner: Montafonerbahn
- Operator: Montafonerbahn
- Line: Bludenz–Schruns railway

History
- Opened: 1905

Services
Preceding station	Vorarlberg S-Bahn	Following station
Vandans towards Bludenz	S4	Tschagguns towards Schruns
Location
- Location within Austria Location within Vorarlberg

Kaltenbrunnen railway station (German: Bahnhof Kaltenbrunnen) is a railway station serving Kaltenbrunnen in the municipality of Schruns in the Bludenz district of the Austrian federal state of Vorarlberg. It is located on the Bludenz–Schruns railway and is owned and operated by the Montafonerbahn (MBS).

== Services ==
As of the December 2023 timetable change, the following regional train services exist:

- Vorarlberg S-Bahn S4: half-hourly service to Bludenz and Schruns.

== See also ==
- History of rail transport in Austria
- Rail transport in Austria
