= Brunnenfeld-Stallehr railway station =

Railway station in Vorarlberg, Austria

Brunnenfeld-Stallehr
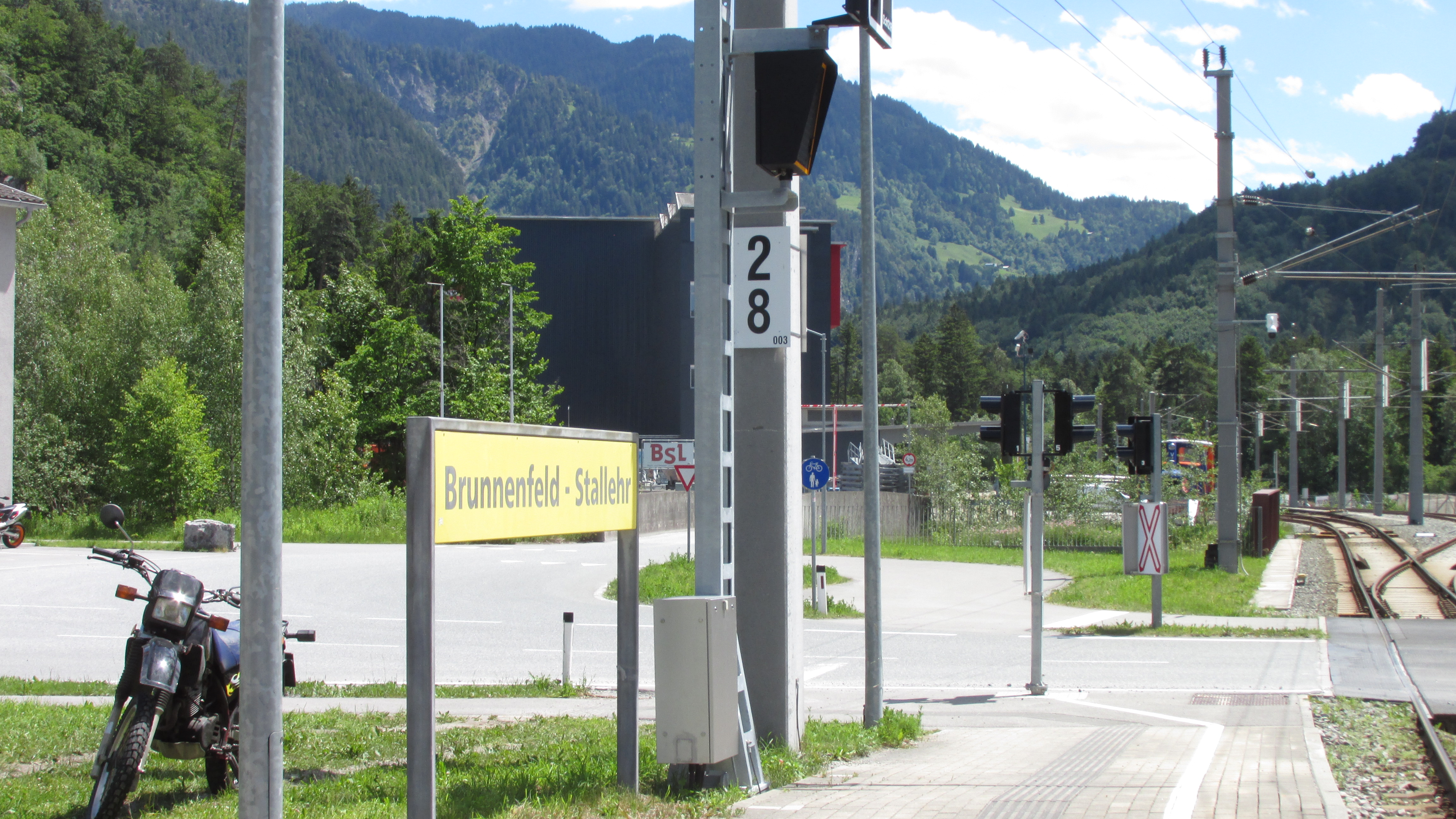

General information
- Location: Alfenzstraẞe; 6700 Bludenz; Austria
- Coordinates: 47°08′11.0004″N 09°50′19.9536″E
- Owner: Montafonerbahn
- Operator: Montafonerbahn
- Line: Bludenz–Schruns railway

History
- Opened: 1905

Services
Preceding station	Vorarlberg S-Bahn	Following station
Bludenz-Moos towards Bludenz	S4	Lorüns towards Schruns
Location
- Location within Austria Location within Vorarlberg

Brunnenfeld-Stallehr railway station (German: Bahnhof Brunnenfeld-Stallehr) serves the Brunnenfeld district of the town of Bludenz and Stallehr, both located in the Bludenz district of the Austrian federal state of Vorarlberg. Located on the Bludenz–Schruns railway, the station is owned and operated by the Montafonerbahn (MBS).

== Services ==
As of the December 2023 timetable change, the following regional train services exist:

- Vorarlberg S-Bahn S4: half-hourly service to Bludenz and Schruns.

== See also ==
- History of rail transport in Austria
- Rail transport in Austria
