= Bludenz-Moos railway station =

Railway station in Vorarlberg, Austria

Bludenz-Moos

General information
- Location: Tränkeweg, 6700 Bludenz; Austria
- Coordinates: 47°08′32.6508″N 09°49′50.9484″E
- Owner: Montafonerbahn
- Operator: Montafonerbahn
- Line: Bludenz–Schruns railway

History
- Opened: 1905

Services
| Preceding station | Vorarlberg S-Bahn | Following station |
|---|---|---|
| Bludenz Terminus | S4 | Brunnenfeld-Stallehr towards Schruns |
Location
- Location within Austria Location within Vorarlberg

Bludenz-Moos railway station (German: Bahnhof Bludenz-Moos) is a railway station in Bludenz in the Bludenz district of the Austrian federal state of Vorarlberg. Located on the Bludenz–Schruns railway, the station is owned and operated by the Montafonerbahn (MBS).

== Services ==
As of the December 2023 timetable change, the following regional train services exist:

- Vorarlberg S-Bahn S4: half-hourly service to Bludenz and Schruns.

== See also ==
- History of rail transport in Austria
- Rail transport in Austria
