= Lorüns railway station =

Railway station in Vorarlberg, Austria

Lorüns
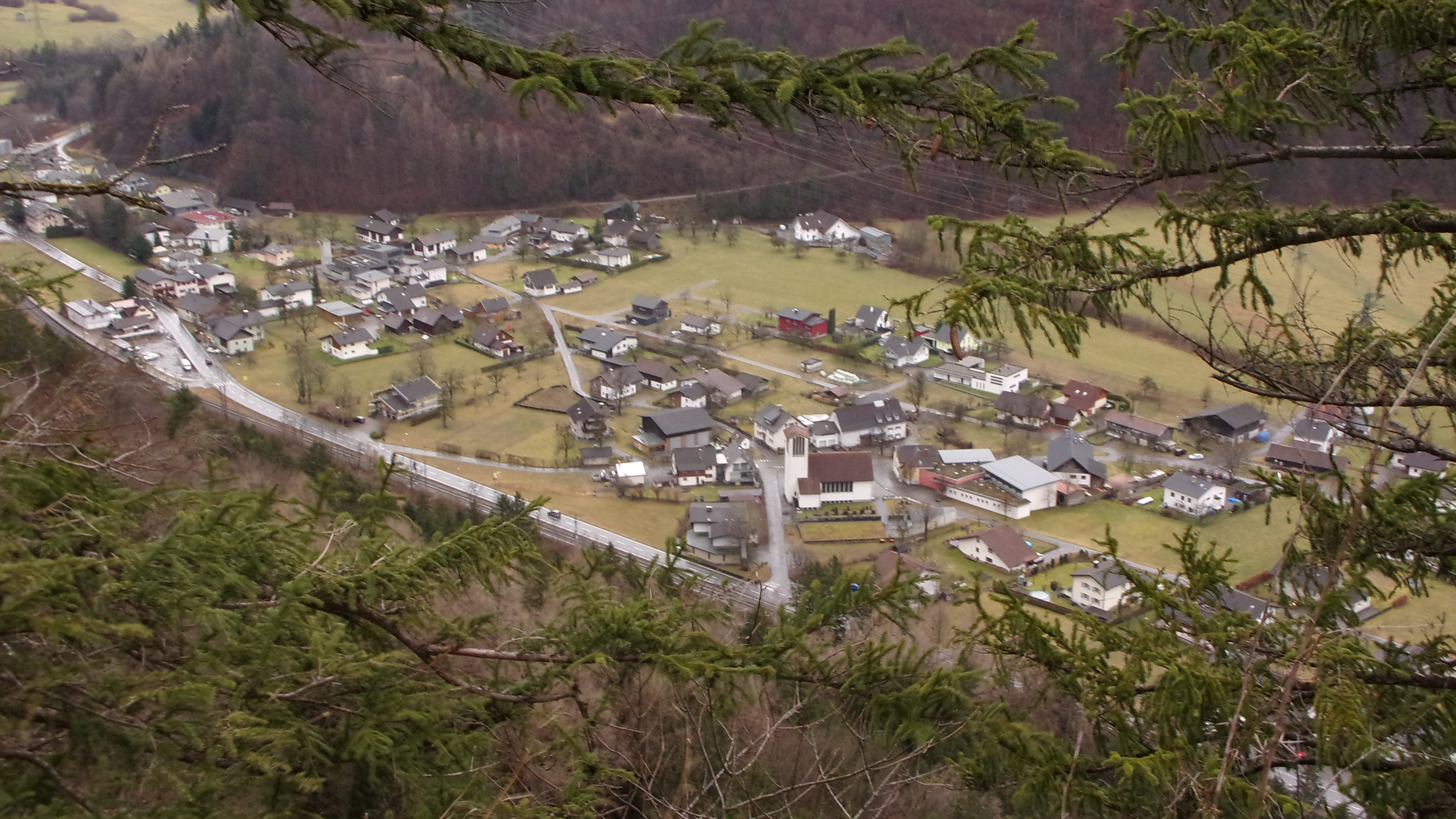
- The station is seen on the left side

General information
- Location: 6700 Lorüns; Austria
- Coordinates: 47°07′50.0592″N 09°51′13.3164″E
- Owner: Montafonerbahn
- Operator: Montafonerbahn
- Line: Bludenz–Schruns railway

History
- Opened: 1905

Services
Preceding station	Vorarlberg S-Bahn	Following station
Brunnenfeld-Stallehr towards Bludenz	S4	St. Anton im Montafon towards Schruns
Location
- Location within Austria Location within Vorarlberg

Lorüns railway station (German: Bahnhof Lorüns) serves Lorüns in the Bludenz district of the Austrian federal state of Vorarlberg. Located on the Bludenz–Schruns railway, the station is owned and operated by the Montafonerbahn (MBS).

== Services ==
As of the December 2023 timetable change, the following regional train services exist:

- Vorarlberg S-Bahn S4: half-hourly service to Bludenz and Schruns.

== See also ==
- History of rail transport in Austria
- Rail transport in Austria
