= Vandans railway station =

Railway station in Vorarlberg, Austria

Vandans
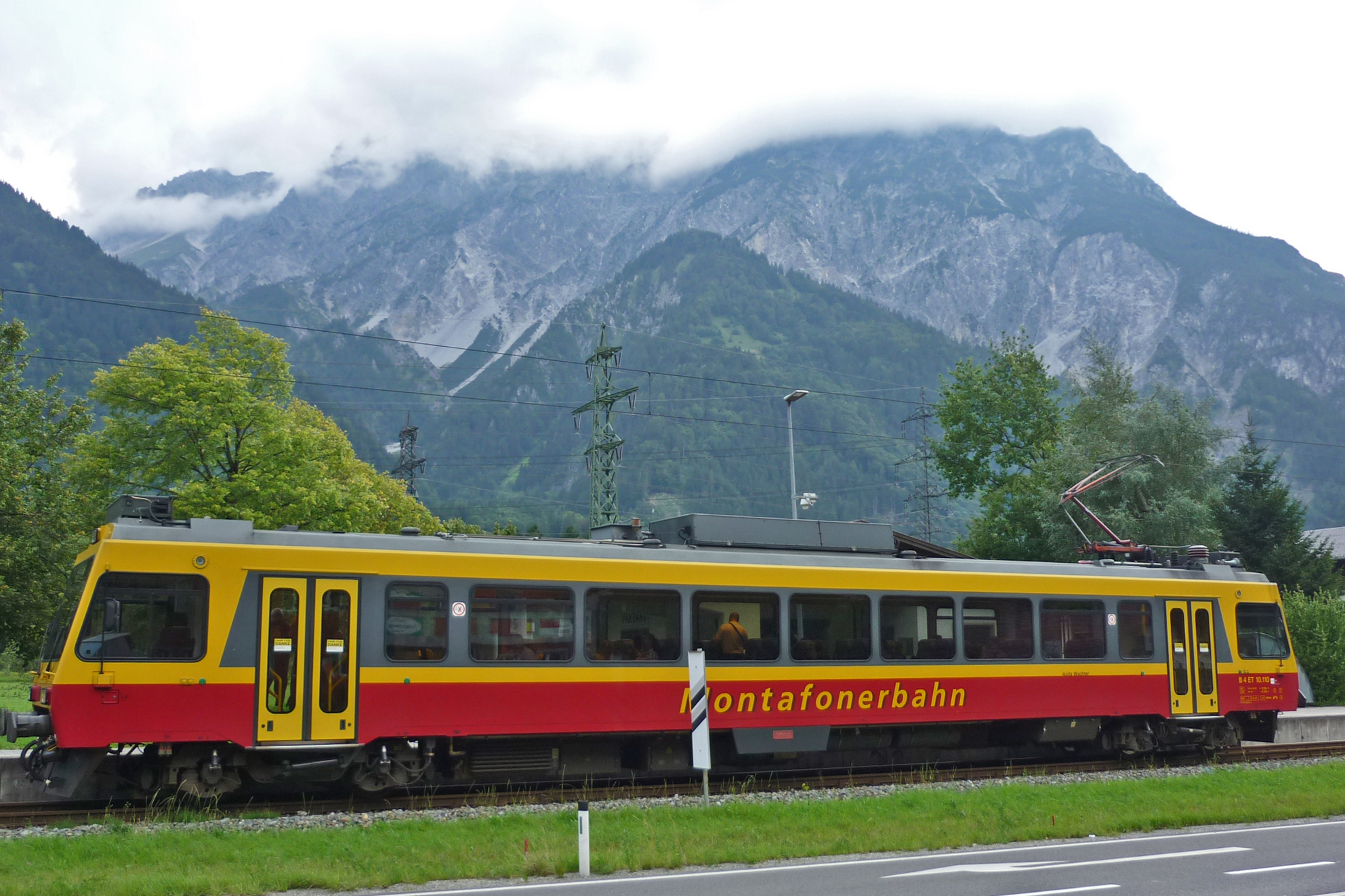

General information
- Location: Bödenweg; 6781 Vandans; Austria
- Coordinates: 47°05′54.8232″N 09°52′7.1472″E
- Owner: Montafonerbahn
- Operator: Montafonerbahn
- Line: Bludenz–Schruns railway

History
- Opened: 1905

Services
| Preceding station | Vorarlberg S-Bahn | Following station |
|---|---|---|
| St. Anton im Montafon towards Bludenz | S4 | Kaltenbrunnen towards Schruns |
Location
- Location within Austria Location within Vorarlberg

Vandans railway station (German: Bahnhof Vandans) is a railway station serving Vandans in the Bludenz district of the Austrian federal state of Vorarlberg. Located on the Bludenz–Schruns railway, the station is owned and operated by the Montafonerbahn (MBS).

The railway station is located about 1.2 km (0.75 mi) away from the valley station of the Golmerbahn to Mattschwiz and Golmer Joch.

== Services ==
As of the December 2023 timetable change, the following regional train services exist:

- Vorarlberg S-Bahn S4: half-hourly service to Bludenz and Schruns.

== See also ==
- History of rail transport in Austria
- Rail transport in Austria
