= Tschagguns railway station =

Railway station in Vorarlberg, Austria

Tschagguns

General information
- Location: Batloggstraße; 6780 Schruns; Austria
- Coordinates: 47°04′44.8176″N 09°54′16.7652″E
- Owner: Montafonerbahn
- Operator: Montafonerbahn
- Line: Bludenz–Schruns railway

History
- Opened: 1905

Services
Preceding station	Vorarlberg S-Bahn	Following station
Kaltenbrunnen towards Bludenz	S4	Schruns Terminus
Location
- Location within Austria Location within Vorarlberg

Tschagguns railway station (German: Bahnhof Tschagguns) is a railway station in the municipality of Schruns in the Bludenz district of the Austrian federal state of Vorarlberg. It serves the village of Tschagguns. The station is located on the Bludenz–Schruns railway and is owned and operated by the Montafonerbahn (MBS).

== Services ==
As of the December 2023 timetable change, the following regional train services exist:

- Vorarlberg S-Bahn S4: half-hourly service to Bludenz and Schruns.

== See also ==
- History of rail transport in Austria
- Rail transport in Austria
