= Tschagguns =

- Municipality
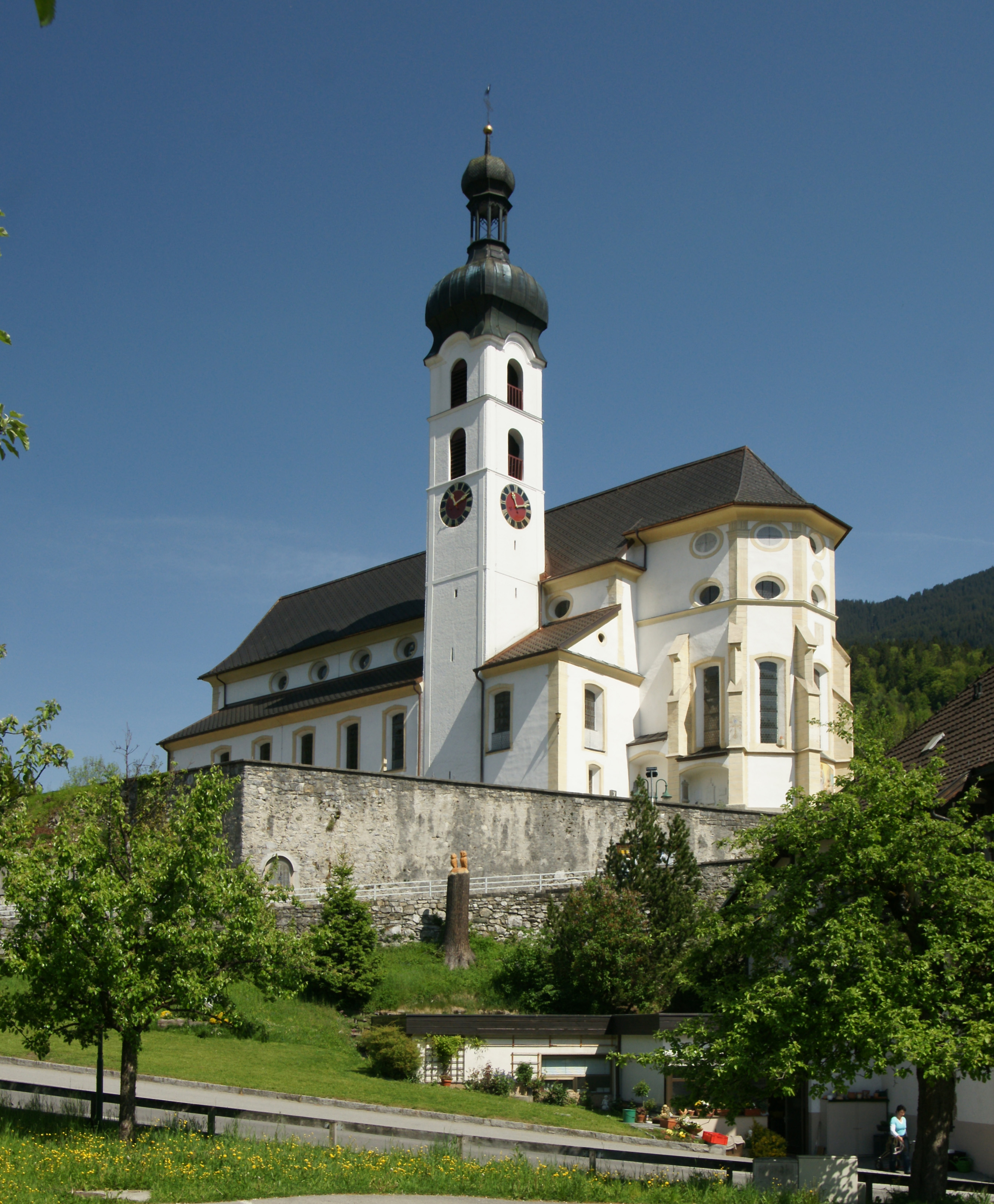

- Coat of arms

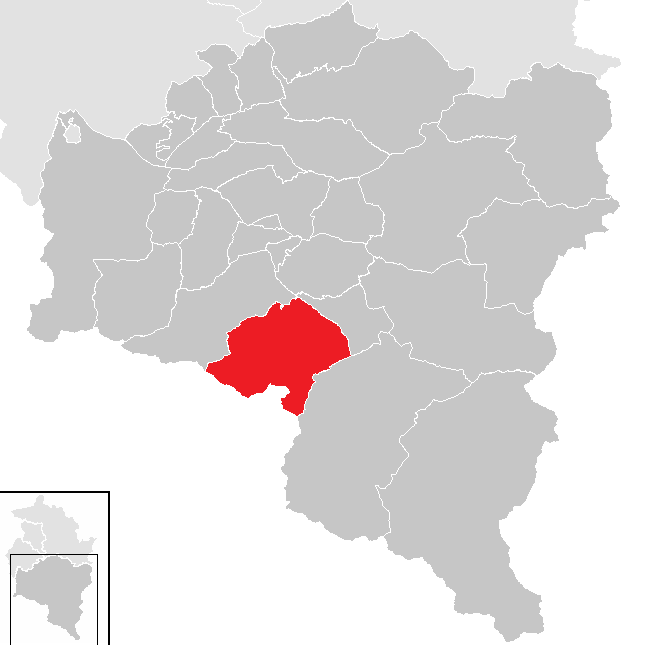
- Location in the district

- Location within Austria
- Coordinates: 47°04′36″N 09°54′03″E
- Country: Austria
- State: Vorarlberg
- District: Bludenz

Government
  - Mayor: Herbert Bitschnau

Area
  - Total: 57.65 km^{2} (22.26 sq mi)
- Elevation: 685 m (2,247 ft)

Population (2018-01-01)
  - Total: 2,195
  - Density: 38.07/km^{2} (98.61/sq mi)
- Time zone: UTC+1 (CET)
  - Summer (DST): UTC+2 (CEST)
- Postal code: 6774
- Area code: 05556
- Vehicle registration: BZ
- Website: www.tschagguns.at

Tschagguns is a village in the Montafon valley, Bludenz district in the Austrian state of Vorarlberg. Tschagguns offers skiing with its own ski resort called Golm. Tschagguns offers hiking, mountain biking, winter sports and much more. Gauertal is a valley found in Tschagguns between Mittagspitze and Golm. It is famous for the "3 Türme" which means 3 Towers.

== Population ==
Historical population
Year	Pop.	±%
1869	1,006	—
1880	1,024	+1.8%
1890	992	−3.1%
1900	895	−9.8%
1910	947	+5.8%
1923	1,028	+8.6%
1934	971	−5.5%
1939	1,330	+37.0%
1951	1,572	+18.2%
1961	1,769	+12.5%
1971	2,196	+24.1%
1981	2,176	−0.9%
1991	2,237	+2.8%
2001	2,335	+4.4%
2011	2,185	−6.4%

== Sons and daughters of the place ==
- Werner Bleiner (born 1946), ski racer
- Christian Orlainsky (born 1962), ski racer
- Stefan Bitschnau (born unknown), Engineer

== Persons with reference to the place ==
- Georg Friedrich Haas (born 1953 in Graz), composer, has grown up in Tschagguns

== Honorary citizen ==
- Arnold Durig (1872–1961), physiologist

== Transport ==
Tschagguns railway station is located on the Bludenz–Schruns railway line. The station is called at by the S4 regional train service of Vorarlberg S-Bahn, operated by Montafonerbahn (MBS).
