= Montafonerbahn =

Railway line in Austria

Montafon Railway
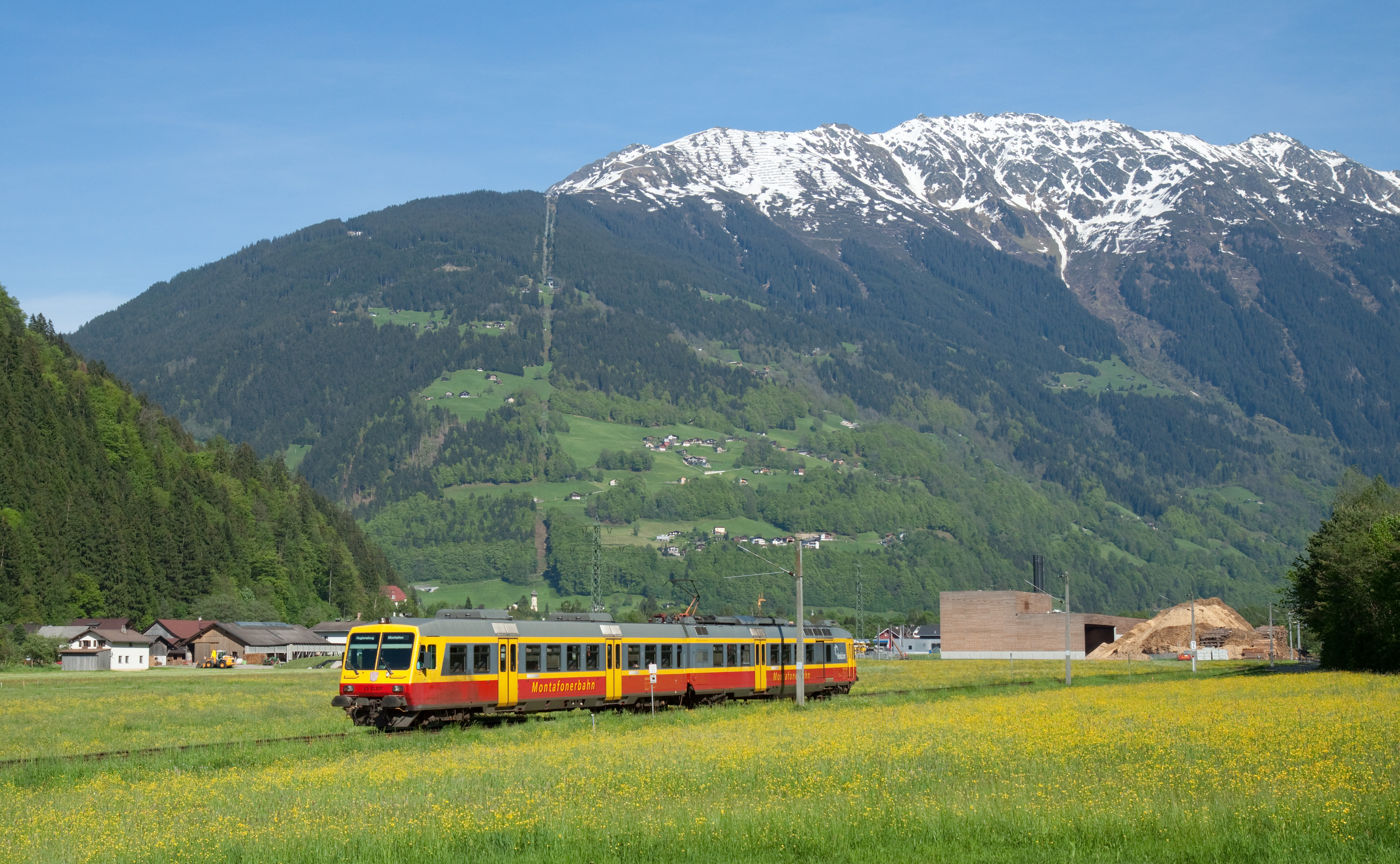
- An NPZ of the Montafonerbahn between Tschagguns and Kaltenbrunnen in 2010.

Overview
- Native name: Montafonerbahn
- Owner: Montafonerbahn AG
- Locale: Montafon Valley, Vorarlberg, Austria
- Termini: Bludenz; Schruns
- Connecting lines: At Bludenz: Arlberg railway; Vorarlberg Railway
- Former connections: At Tschagguns: Tschagguns–Partenen railway
- Stations: 9

Service
- Type: Branch line
- System: Vorarlberg S-Bahn

History
- Opened: 1905

Technical
- Line length: 12.874 km (8.000 mi)
- Track gauge: 1,435 mm (4 ft 8 1/2 in)
- Minimum radius: 170 m (560 ft)
- Electrification: 15 kV 16.7 Hz
- Operating speed: 90 km/h (56 mph)
Route map
- Montafonerbahn
- Montafonerbahn AG; Vorarlberg S-Bahn; Sources
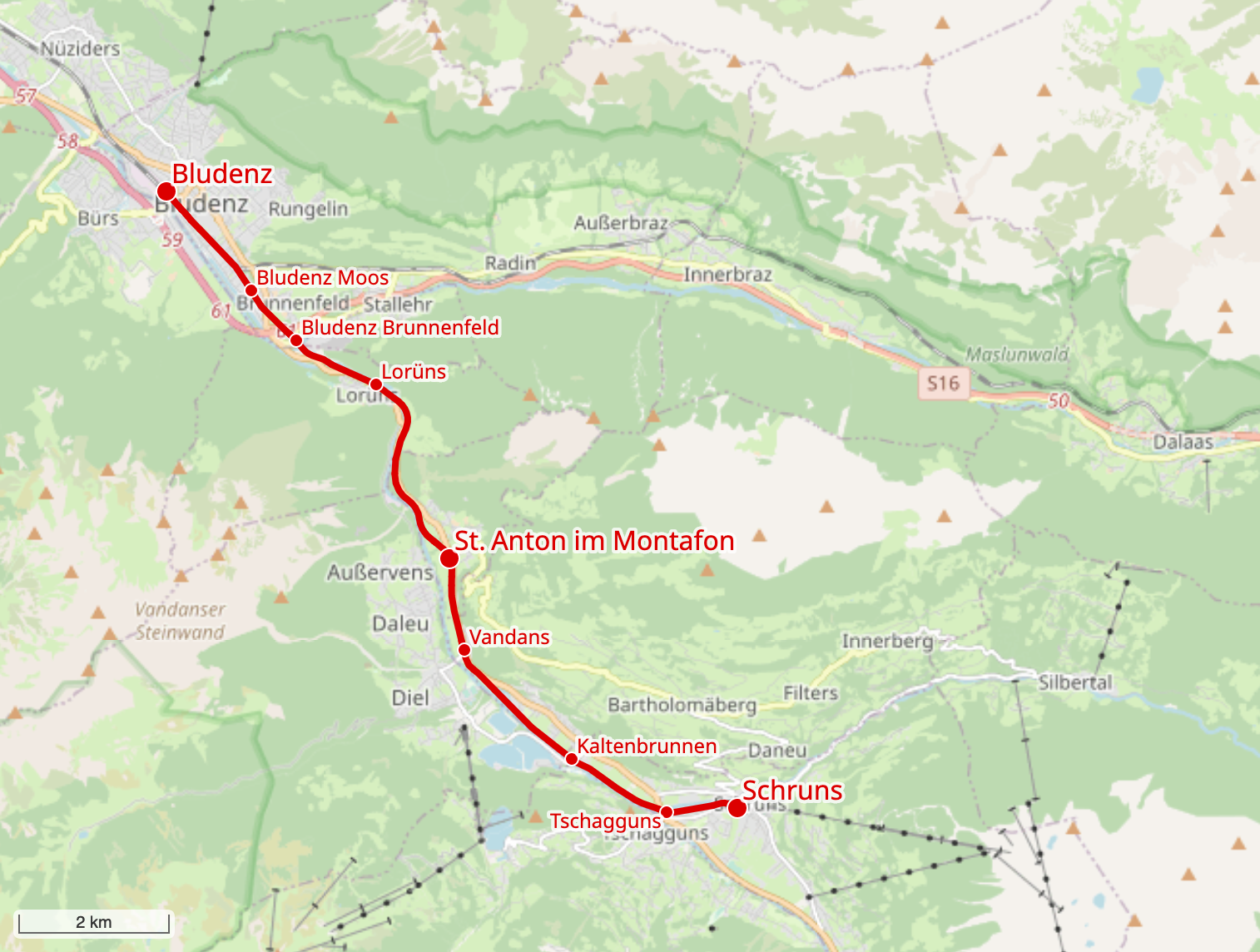

The Montafonerbahn (German: Montafonerbahn, lit. 'Montafon railway') is a railway line in the Austrian state of Vorarlberg. It runs 12.8 kilometers from the Schruns railway station in Schruns to Bludenz railway station in Bludenz, where it connects to the Arlberg railway and the Vorarlberg Railway, which together form the east–west main line in Vorarlberg. Local services on the line are designated the ● S4 of the Vorarlberg S-Bahn and are operated by the Montafonerbahn railway company (MBS), which also operates freight traffic on the line.

== Operations ==
=== Current ===
Per the December 2024 ÖBB schedule, the line sees two service patterns, both belonging to the Vorarlberg S-Bahn, the ● S4, and the ● REX 1. The resulting combined frequency is 30 minutes on the Montafonerbahn, where both services make local stops. While the S4 terminates at the end of the branch in Bludenz, the REX 1 continues along the Vorarlberg railway to Lindau, as an express service to the ● S1.

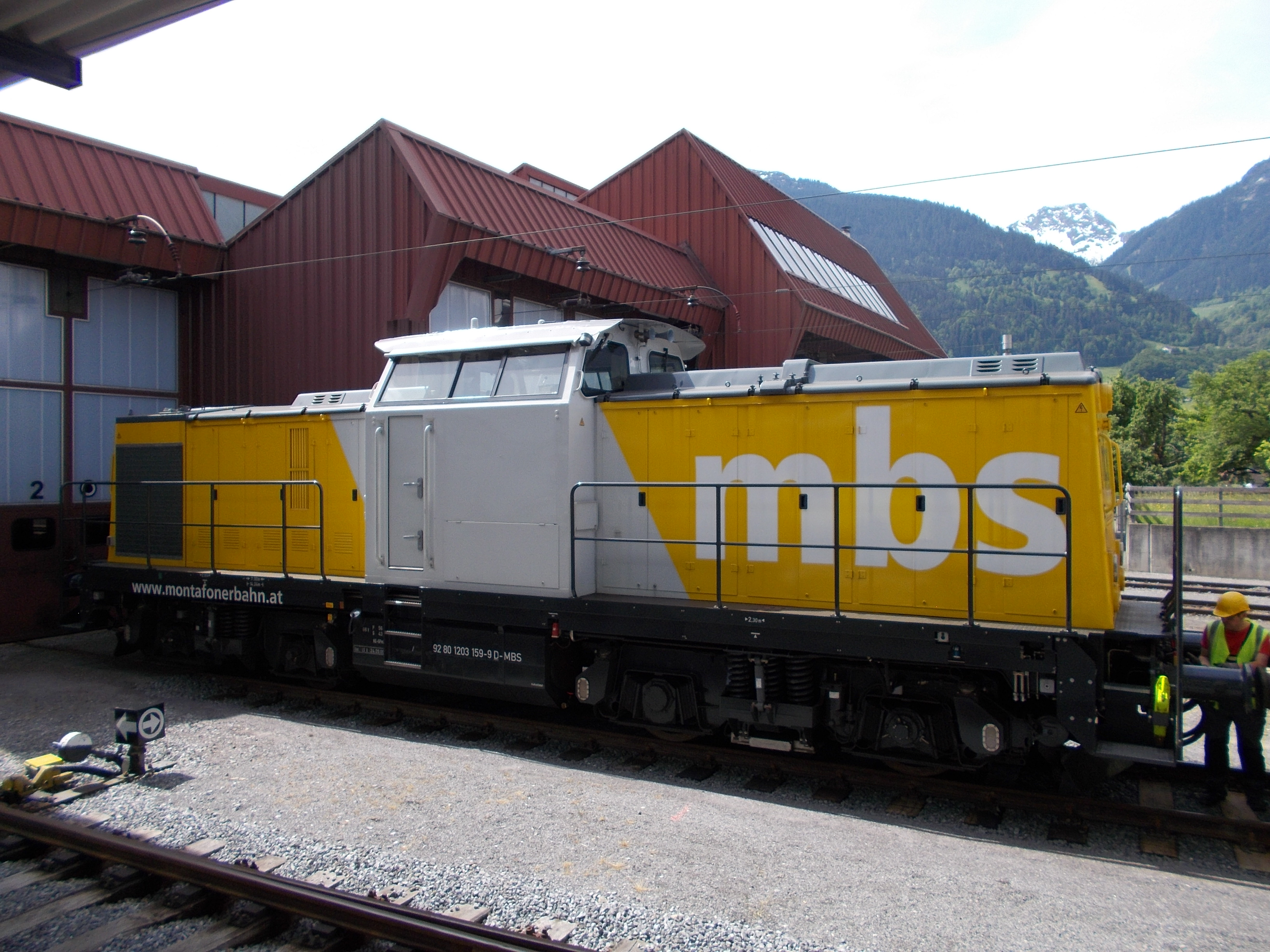
MBS V100 locomotive in Schruns.

Freight service on the line is operated by MBS using a V100 diesel locomotive.

=== Former ===
In the 1970s and 1980s Deutsche Bundesbahn ran a long-distance through-car service from Schruns to Dortmund under the Fern-Express designation. (Note: Being part of FD 712/713 in earlier years and FD 1912/1913 in later years, both named "Allgäu" from Dortmund to Oberstdorf.) On the line, the through-car was coupled to an MBS motorcar or locomotive.

From 1980 and until 2009, the MBS operated two ÖBB class 1045 locomotives for freight service on the line. They were replaced by a V100 diesel locomotive and were sent to preservation with the Austrian Society for Railway History.

== History ==
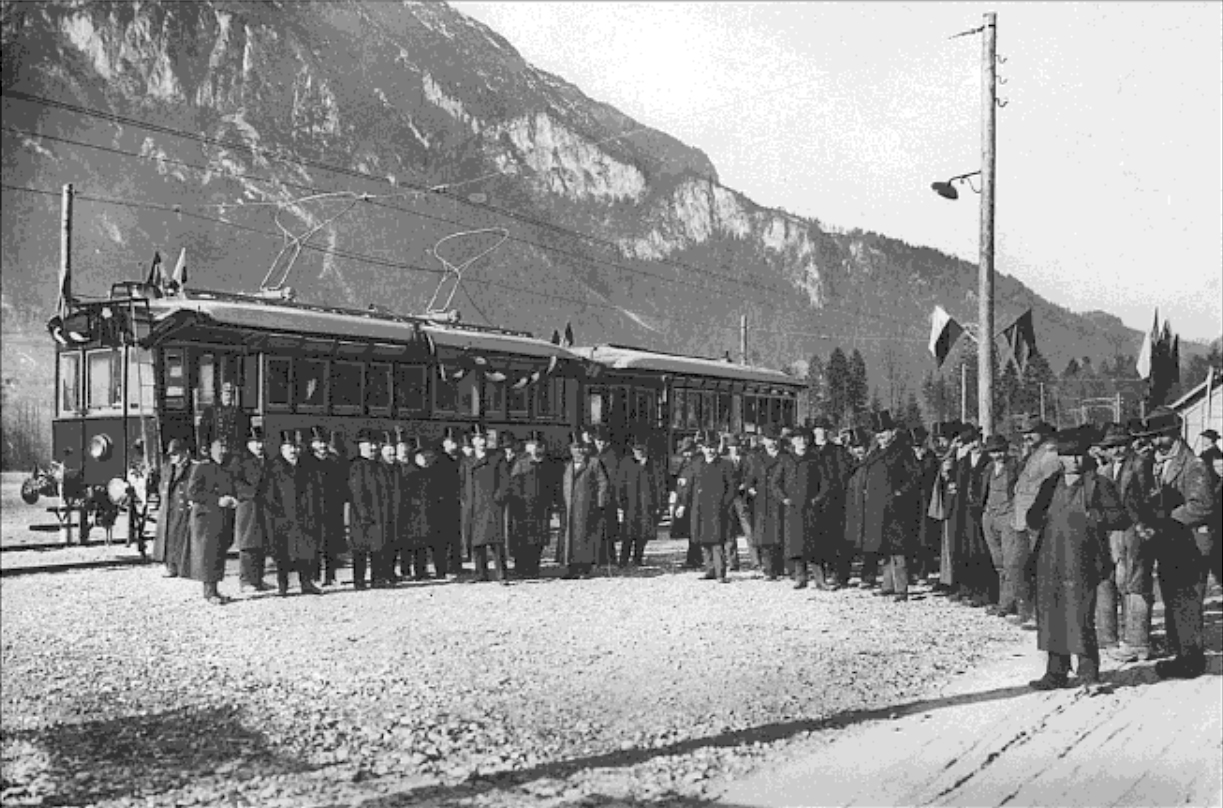
The inaugural train of the Montafonerbahn in 1905.

Rail transport reached the area in 1884, with the opening of the Arlberg Railway to Bludenz, and initial plans for a railway in the Montafon Valley appeared at around this time. A contract for the construction of railway electrification was signed with the electrical manufacturer Siemens & Halske in 1893, though the character of the line was still undecided at this time. Preparatory work on a standard gauge, electric railway line started in 1903 with Josef Riehl as contractor.

The Montafonerbahn opened on 18 December 1905 as both Austria's westernmost private railway, and the first electric local railway in Austria-Hungary. The line was originally operated by the KkStB, or the Austro-Hungarian national railways. The line was originally electrified with 650 V direct current.

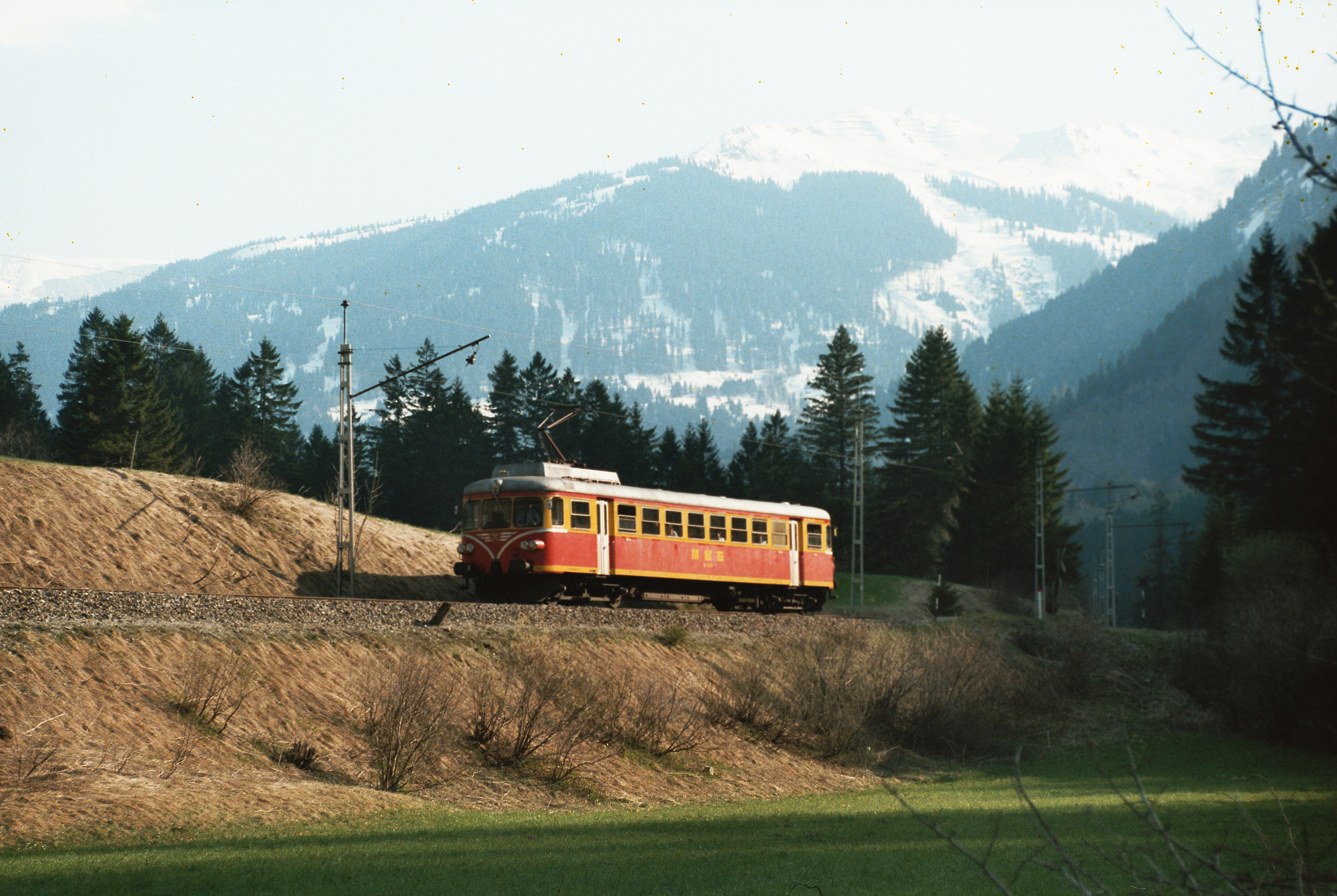
MBS railcar along the line in 1984.

MBS took over operations of the line from the Austrian Federal Railways in 1926.

The connecting narrow gauge Tschagguns–Partenen railway opened in 1928 and connected to the railway. Parts of the narrow gauge railway would survive in some form until 2013.

The line switched its volage in 1950, to 720 V and later 900 V, before adapting the Austrian standard of 15 kV 16.7 Hz alternating current in 1972.

Bludenz-Moos railway station opened in 1965.

The Montafonerbahn received new NPZ railcars in 1994.

In 2015, there were plans from the Austrian Tourist Board to extend the line 8 kilometers further up the valley to Sankt Gallenkirch in order to better connect with the Silvretta Montafon ski area.

== Stations ==
Kilometric Point	Station	Image	Municipality	Connections	Position
0.000 km	Bludenz		Bludenz (Note: Brunnenfeld-Stallehr station also serves Stallehr.)	Arlberg railway; Vorarlberg Railway	47°09′18″N 09°48′53″E
1.685 km	Bludenz-Moos		Bludenz		47°08′32.6508″N 09°49′50.9484″E
2.786 km	Brunnenfeld-Stallehr		Bludenz		47°08′11.0004″N 09°50′19.9536″E
4.075 km	Lorüns		Lorüns		47°07′50.0592″N 09°51′13.3164″E
6.916 km	St. Anton im Montafon		St. Anton im Montafon		47°06′36.126″N 09°51′58.5144″E
8.150 km	Vandans		Bartholomäberg (Note: The station also serves Vandans.)		47°05′54.8232″N 09°52′7.1472″E
10.276 km	Kaltenbrunnen		Schruns (Note: Kaltenbrunnen and Tschagguns stations also serve Tschagguns.)		47°05′7.5732″N 09°53′16.17″E
11.753 km	Tschagguns		Schruns		47°04′44.8176″N 09°54′16.7652″E
12.721 km	Schruns		Schruns		47°04′46.6392″N 09°55′2.9136″E
