= Montafonerbahn AG =

Transport company in Vorarlberg

Montafonerbahn

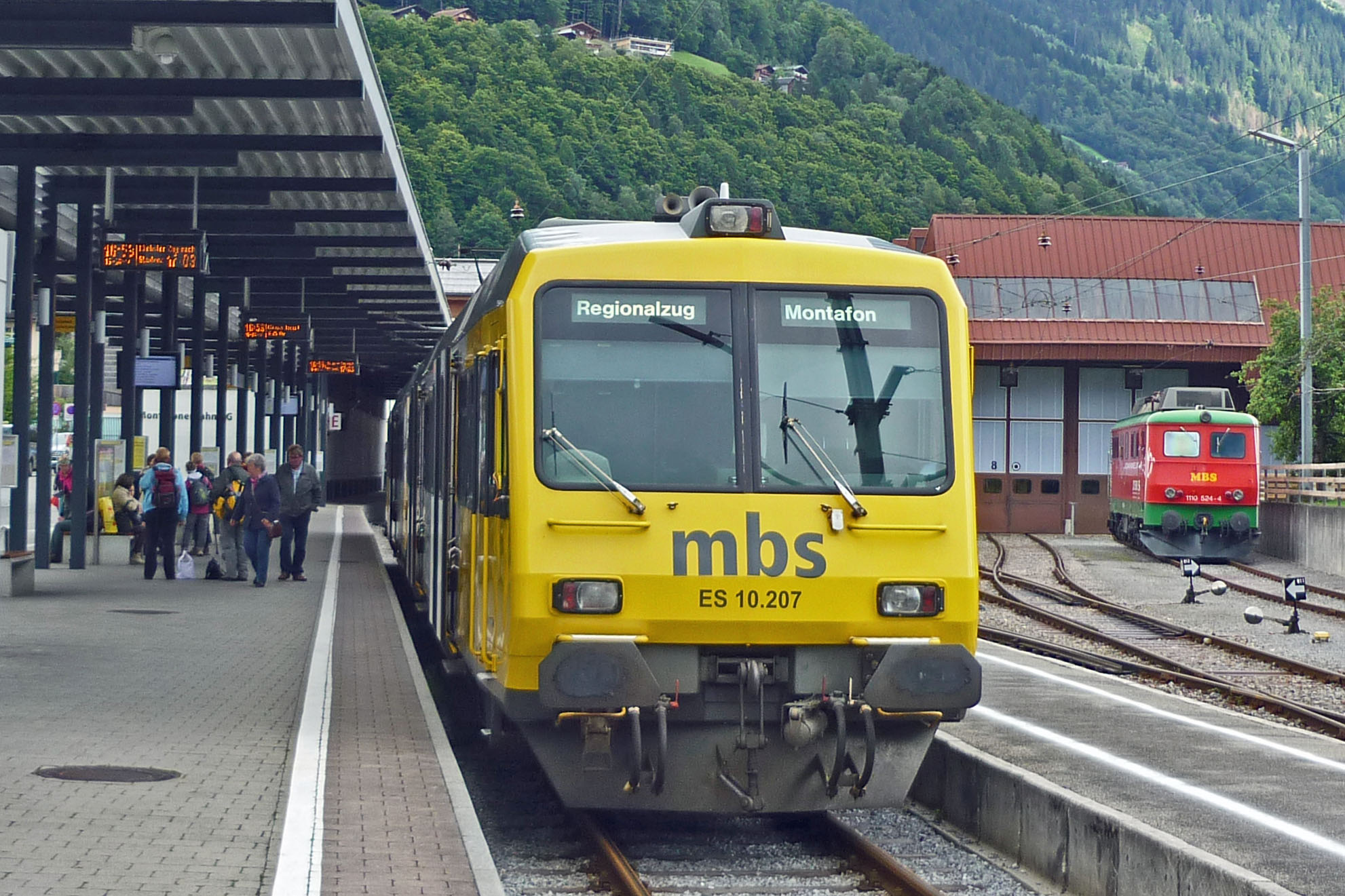
- NPZ of the Montafonerbahn in Schruns

Overview
- Main region: Vorarlberg
- Dates of operation: 1904–

Other
- Website: www.montafonerbahn.at

The Montafonerbahn (Montafon Railway; MBS) is a privately owned Austrian railway company that primarily operates services from Bregenz to Schruns, via Bludenz. The company is headquartered in Schruns.
