= Lorüns =

- Municipality
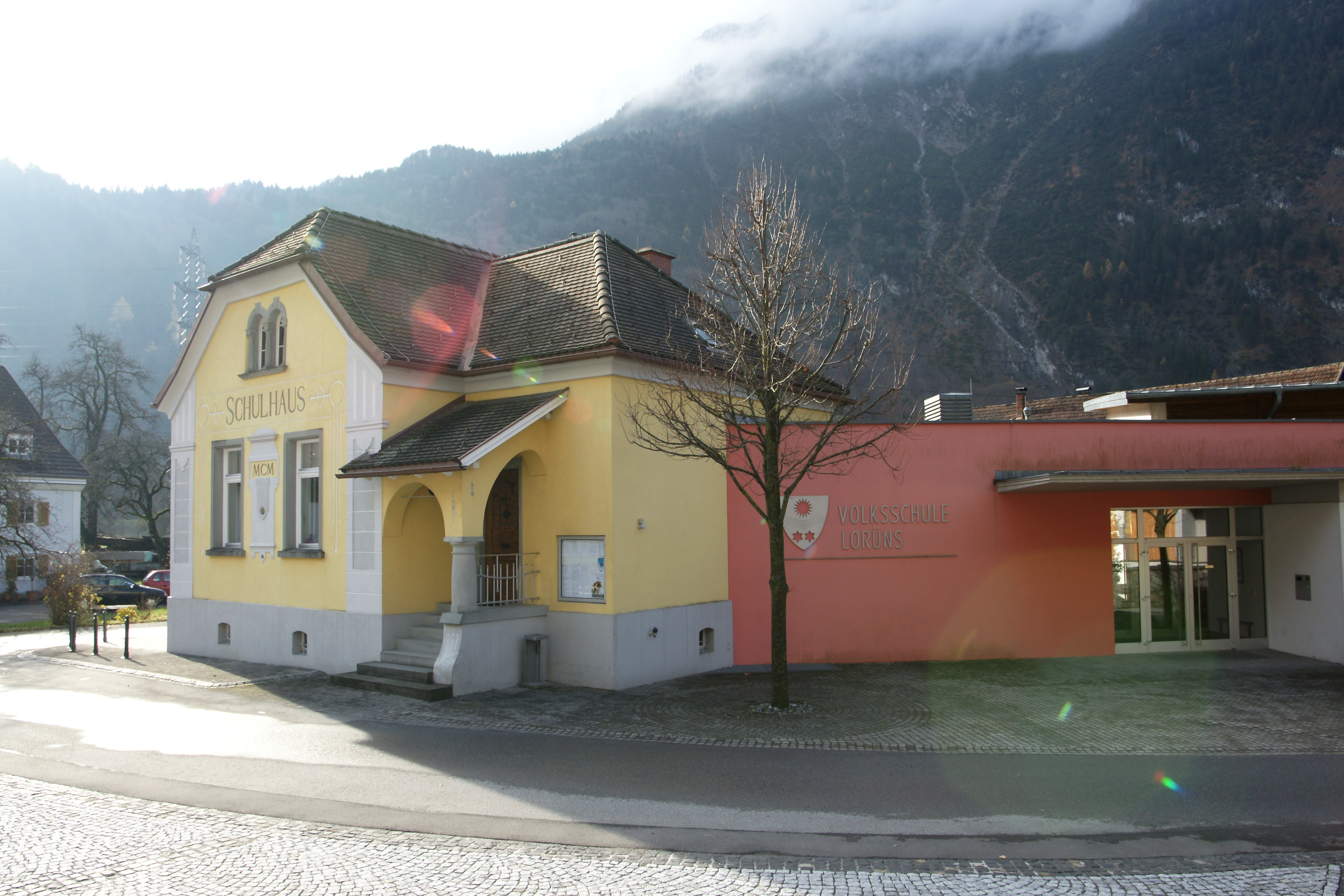

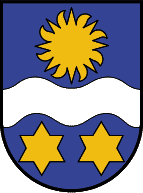
- Coat of arms

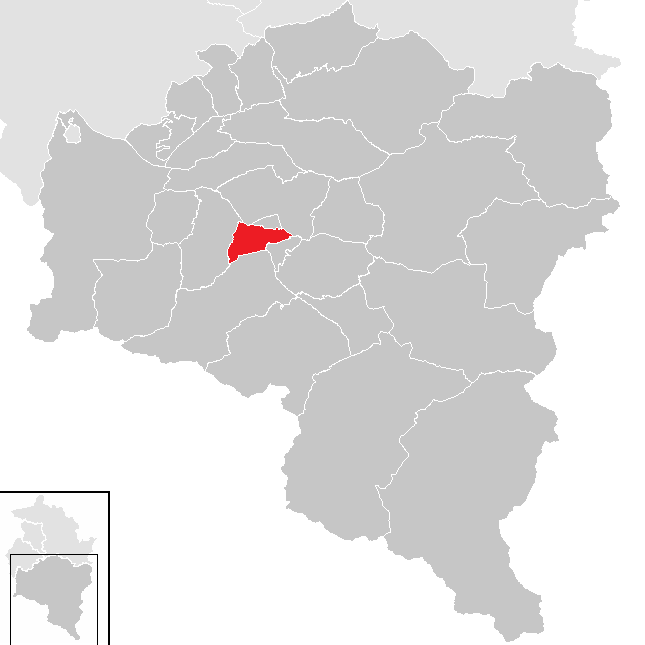
- Location in the district

- Location within Austria
- Coordinates: 47°07′53″N 09°51′00″E
- Country: Austria
- State: Vorarlberg
- District: Bludenz

Government
  - Mayor: Lothar Ladner

Area
  - Total: 8.36 km^{2} (3.23 sq mi)
- Elevation: 583 m (1,913 ft)

Population (2018-01-01)
  - Total: 294
  - Density: 35.2/km^{2} (91.1/sq mi)
- Time zone: UTC+1 (CET)
  - Summer (DST): UTC+2 (CEST)
- Postal code: 6700
- Area code: 05552
- Vehicle registration: BZ
- Website: www.loruens.at

Lorüns is a municipality in the district of Bludenz in the Austrian state of Vorarlberg.

== Population ==
Historical population
Year	Pop.	±%
1869	106	—
1880	103	−2.8%
1890	134	+30.1%
1900	185	+38.1%
1910	143	−22.7%
1923	142	−0.7%
1934	179	+26.1%
1939	177	−1.1%
1951	207	+16.9%
1961	213	+2.9%
1971	213	+0.0%
1981	200	−6.1%
1991	253	+26.5%
2001	265	+4.7%
2011	276	+4.2%

== Transport ==
Lorüns railway station is an intermediate railway station on the Bludenz–Schruns railway line. The station is called at by the S4 regional train service of Vorarlberg S-Bahn, operated by Montafonerbahn (MBS).
