= Tschaggunser Mittagspitze =

Mountain in Vorarlberg, Austria

Tschaggunser Mittagsspitze
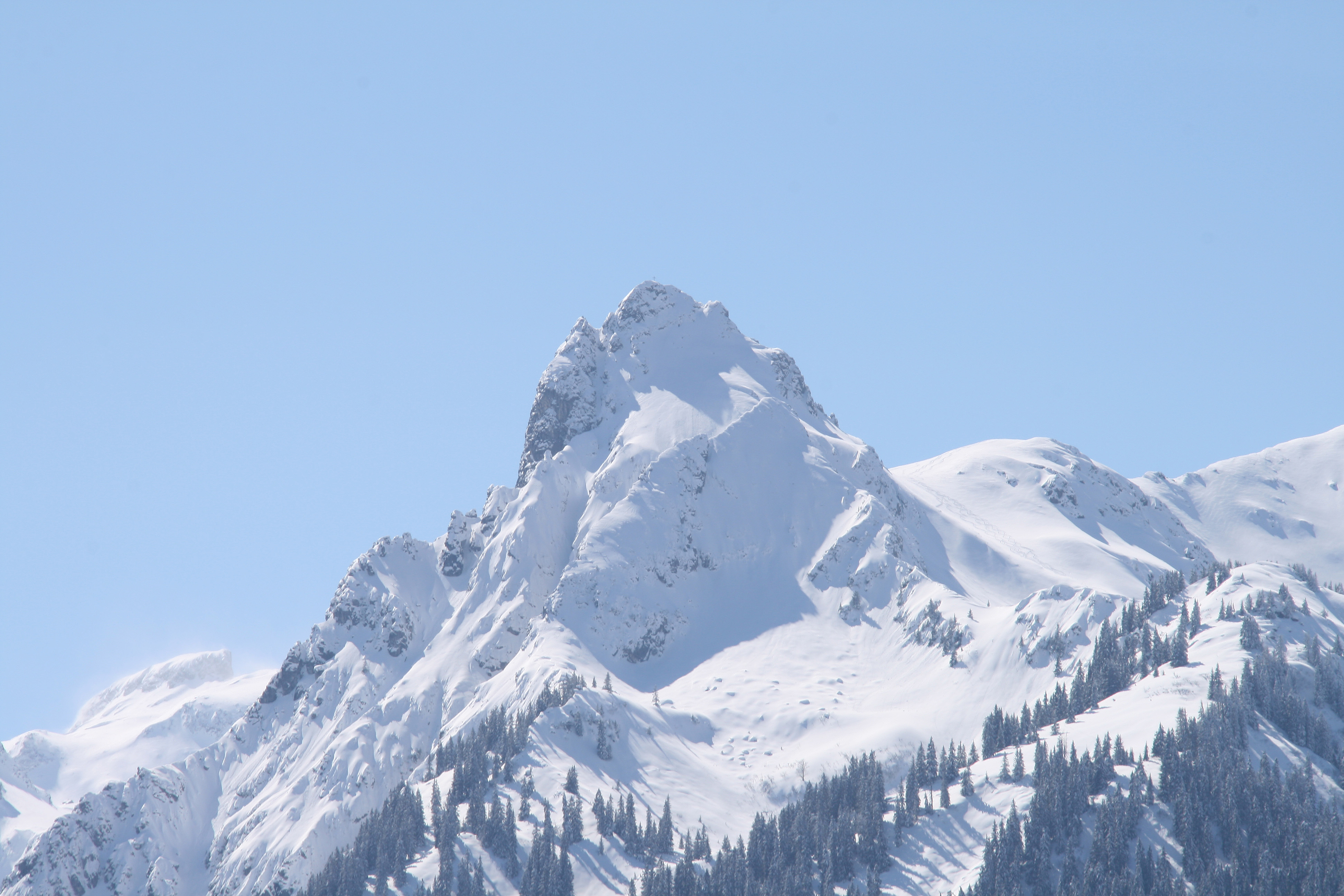
- Tschaggunser Mittagsspitze in winter

Highest point
- Elevation: 2,168 m (7,113 ft)
- Coordinates: 47°2′45″N 9°53′6″E

Geography
- Location within Alps
- Location: Vorarlberg, Austria
- Parent range: Rätikon, Central Eastern Alps

The Tschaggunser Mittagsspitze is a 2,168 m (AA) high mountain in the Rätikon mountain range of the Central Eastern Alps. It is located in the Austrian state Vorarlberg, south of the village Tschagguns in the Montafon valley.

== Etymology ==
The name of Tschaggunser Mittagsspitze may be traced to "peak ("-spitze") above which the sun culminates at noon ("Mittag-") as seen from Tschagguns".
