= Vandans =

- Municipality
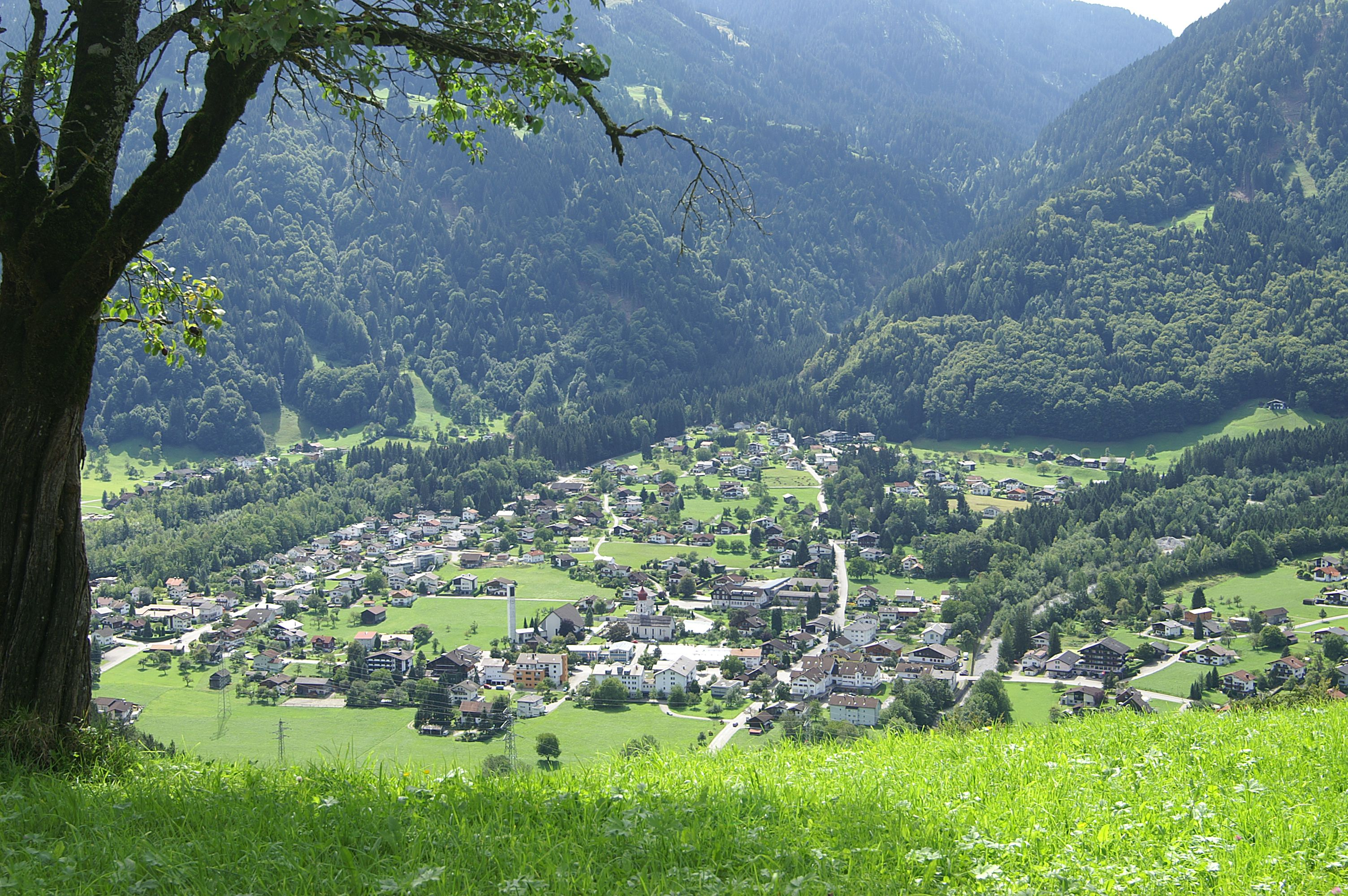

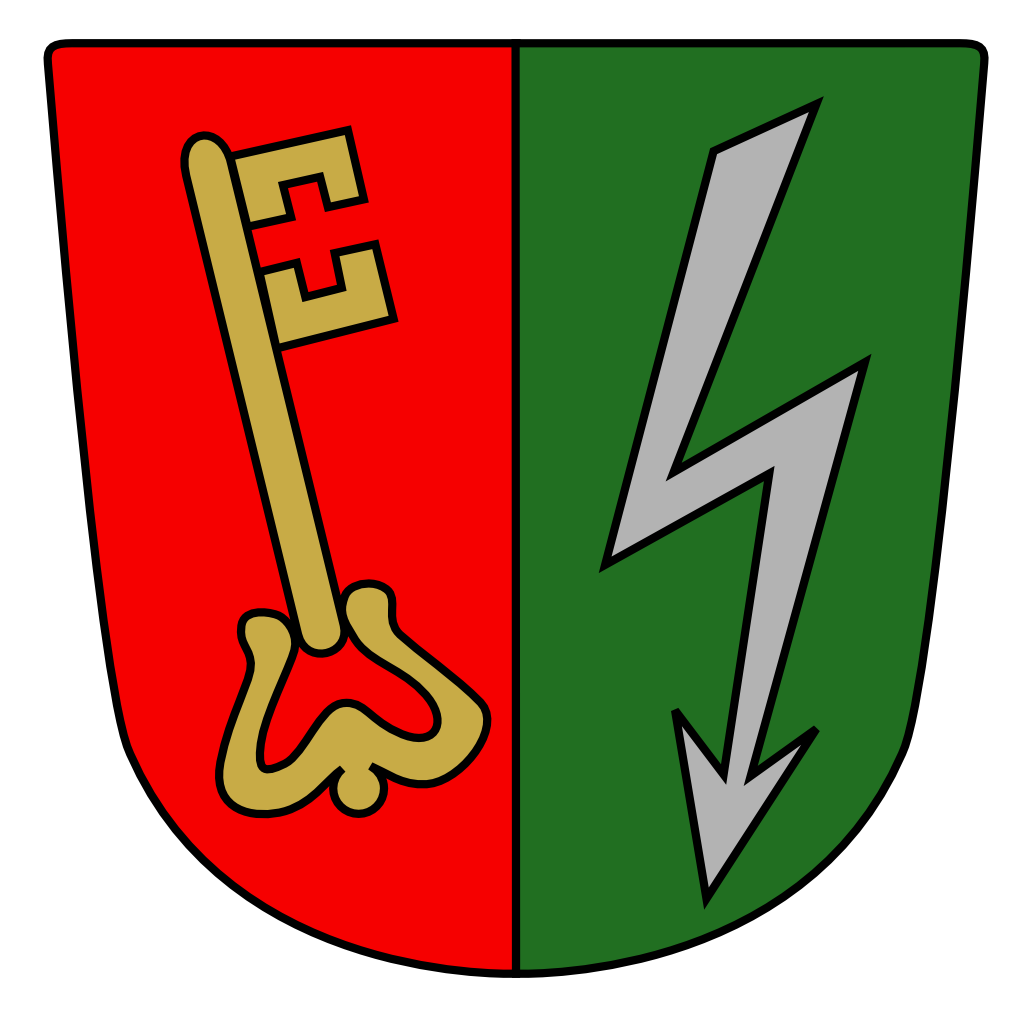
- Coat of arms

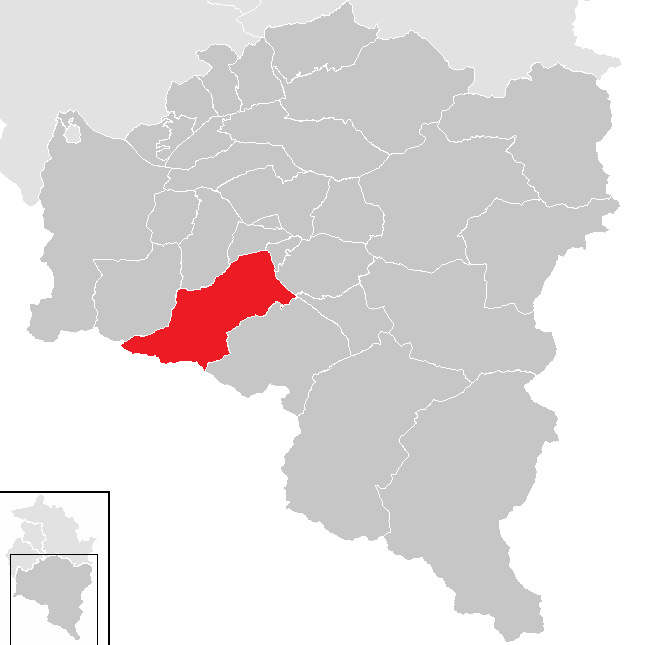
- Location in the district

- Location within Austria
- Coordinates: 47°05′43″N 09°51′56″E
- Country: Austria
- State: Vorarlberg
- District: Bludenz

Government
  - Mayor: Florian Küng

Area
  - Total: 53.44 km^{2} (20.63 sq mi)
- Elevation: 660 m (2,170 ft)

Population (2018-01-01)
  - Total: 2,636
  - Density: 49.33/km^{2} (127.8/sq mi)
- Time zone: UTC+1 (CET)
  - Summer (DST): UTC+2 (CEST)
- Postal code: 6773
- Area code: 05556
- Vehicle registration: BZ
- Website: www.vandans.at

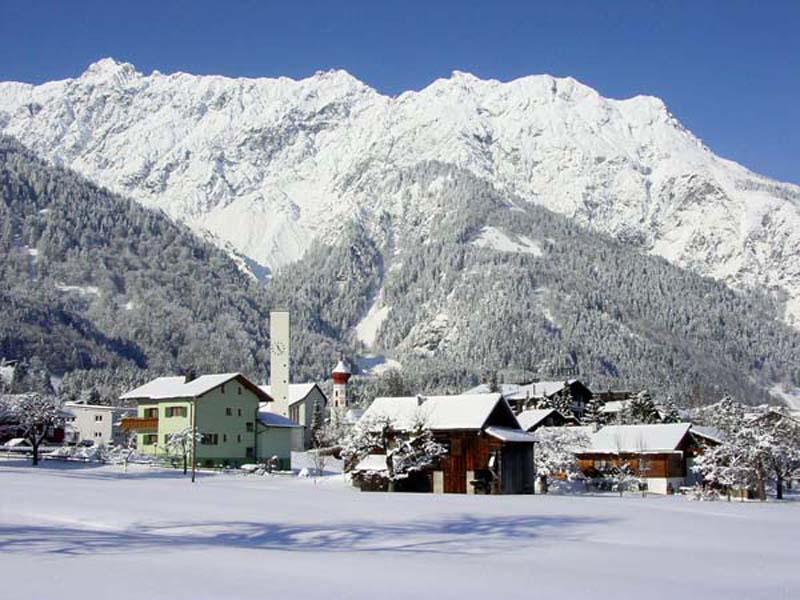
Vandans in winter

Vandans is a town located in the Bludenz district in the Austrian state of Vorarlberg. Located 650 m (2133 ft) above sea level, it is known for its skiing and hiking activities.

== Population ==
Historical population
Year	Pop.	±%
1869	711	—
1880	690	−3.0%
1890	625	−9.4%
1900	641	+2.6%
1910	652	+1.7%
1923	697	+6.9%
1934	874	+25.4%
1939	825	−5.6%
1951	1,169	+41.7%
1961	1,546	+32.2%
1971	1,828	+18.2%
1981	2,033	+11.2%
1991	2,311	+13.7%
2001	2,638	+14.1%
2011	2,605	−1.3%

== Climate ==
Climate data for Vandans (1981–2010)
Month	Jan	Feb	Mar	Apr	May	Jun	Jul	Aug	Sep	Oct	Nov	Dec	Year
Record high °C (°F)	16.5 (61.7)	19.7 (67.5)	23.6 (74.5)	26.2 (79.2)	30.8 (87.4)	33.4 (92.1)	35.4 (95.7)	36.3 (97.3)	29.1 (84.4)	27.1 (80.8)	23.8 (74.8)	19.7 (67.5)	36.3 (97.3)
Mean daily maximum °C (°F)	3.1 (37.6)	4.9 (40.8)	9.8 (49.6)	14.3 (57.7)	19.2 (66.6)	21.6 (70.9)	23.6 (74.5)	22.9 (73.2)	18.9 (66.0)	14.7 (58.5)	7.5 (45.5)	3.4 (38.1)	13.7 (56.7)
Daily mean °C (°F)	−1.1 (30.0)	−0.2 (31.6)	3.7 (38.7)	7.9 (46.2)	12.7 (54.9)	15.3 (59.5)	17.2 (63.0)	16.5 (61.7)	12.8 (55.0)	8.7 (47.7)	3.0 (37.4)	−0.3 (31.5)	8.0 (46.4)
Mean daily minimum °C (°F)	−4.1 (24.6)	−3.5 (25.7)	−0.1 (31.8)	3.1 (37.6)	7.3 (45.1)	10.1 (50.2)	12.1 (53.8)	11.9 (53.4)	8.8 (47.8)	5.1 (41.2)	0.1 (32.2)	−3.0 (26.6)	4.0 (39.2)
Record low °C (°F)	−23.9 (−11.0)	−18.2 (−0.8)	−16.7 (1.9)	−7.3 (18.9)	−2.0 (28.4)	0.5 (32.9)	4.2 (39.6)	3.5 (38.3)	−0.7 (30.7)	−7.9 (17.8)	−13.1 (8.4)	−14.9 (5.2)	−23.9 (−11.0)
Average precipitation mm (inches)	96 (3.8)	88 (3.5)	105 (4.1)	93 (3.7)	116 (4.6)	156 (6.1)	173 (6.8)	171 (6.7)	129 (5.1)	89 (3.5)	104 (4.1)	109 (4.3)	1,430 (56.3)
Average relative humidity (%) (at 14:00)	73.8	65.0	56.0	50.5	52.4	56.4	57.6	60.4	64.0	66.3	74.2	77.8	62.9
Mean monthly sunshine hours	44	82	132	157	183	180	209	196	162	119	55	29	1,548
Percentage possible sunshine	48.3	53.0	47.4	47.9	49.9	49.4	55.9	55.6	53.8	56.4	44.1	45.1	50.6
Source: Central Institute for Meteorology and Geodynamics

Climate data for Vandans (1971–2000)
Month	Jan	Feb	Mar	Apr	May	Jun	Jul	Aug	Sep	Oct	Nov	Dec	Year
Record high °C (°F)	16.5 (61.7)	19.7 (67.5)	23.6 (74.5)	25.6 (78.1)	30.1 (86.2)	32.2 (90.0)	35.4 (95.7)	33.0 (91.4)	29.1 (84.4)	27.1 (80.8)	23.8 (74.8)	19.7 (67.5)	35.4 (95.7)
Mean daily maximum °C (°F)	2.8 (37.0)	4.7 (40.5)	9.5 (49.1)	13.6 (56.5)	18.6 (65.5)	20.7 (69.3)	23.0 (73.4)	22.7 (72.9)	18.9 (66.0)	14.4 (57.9)	7.3 (45.1)	3.6 (38.5)	13.3 (55.9)
Daily mean °C (°F)	−1.4 (29.5)	−0.3 (31.5)	3.6 (38.5)	7.3 (45.1)	12.1 (53.8)	14.6 (58.3)	16.7 (62.1)	16.3 (61.3)	12.7 (54.9)	8.5 (47.3)	2.7 (36.9)	−0.1 (31.8)	7.7 (45.9)
Mean daily minimum °C (°F)	−4.5 (23.9)	−3.7 (25.3)	−0.2 (31.6)	2.7 (36.9)	6.8 (44.2)	9.6 (49.3)	11.8 (53.2)	11.7 (53.1)	8.6 (47.5)	4.9 (40.8)	−0.3 (31.5)	−3.0 (26.6)	3.7 (38.7)
Record low °C (°F)	−23.9 (−11.0)	−18.2 (−0.8)	−12.3 (9.9)	−5.3 (22.5)	−3.5 (25.7)	0.5 (32.9)	4.2 (39.6)	3.5 (38.3)	−0.7 (30.7)	−6.7 (19.9)	−15.4 (4.3)	−14.8 (5.4)	−23.9 (−11.0)
Average precipitation mm (inches)	97.0 (3.82)	89.1 (3.51)	109.7 (4.32)	96.7 (3.81)	116.4 (4.58)	162.8 (6.41)	181.1 (7.13)	164.6 (6.48)	129.8 (5.11)	87.8 (3.46)	99.8 (3.93)	112.8 (4.44)	1,447.6 (56.99)
Average snowfall cm (inches)	55.9 (22.0)	53.4 (21.0)	39.7 (15.6)	11.1 (4.4)	1.2 (0.5)	0.0 (0.0)	0.0 (0.0)	0.0 (0.0)	0.4 (0.2)	0.1 (0.0)	22.6 (8.9)	47.9 (18.9)	232.3 (91.5)
Average precipitation days (≥ 1.0 mm)	11.3	10.0	13.0	11.8	13.5	15.6	15.0	13.9	11.6	9.9	10.8	11.8	148.2
Average relative humidity (%) (at 14:00)	73.3	64.6	55.9	49.9	51.7	56.3	56.9	58.9	62.3	65.0	72.7	77.0	62.0
Mean monthly sunshine hours	42.6	82.0	126.6	150.2	180.7	159.7	199.5	192.0	164.6	116.4	55.2	28.9	1,498.4
Percentage possible sunshine	50.0	51.8	45.5	45.8	48.5	44.2	54.2	54.5	54.1	54.0	44.8	46.1	49.5
Source: Central Institute for Meteorology and Geodynamics

== Transport ==
Vandans railway station is an intermediate railway station on the Bludenz–Schruns railway line. The station is called at by the S4 regional train service of Vorarlberg S-Bahn, operated by Montafonerbahn (MBS).
