= Stallehr =

- Municipality
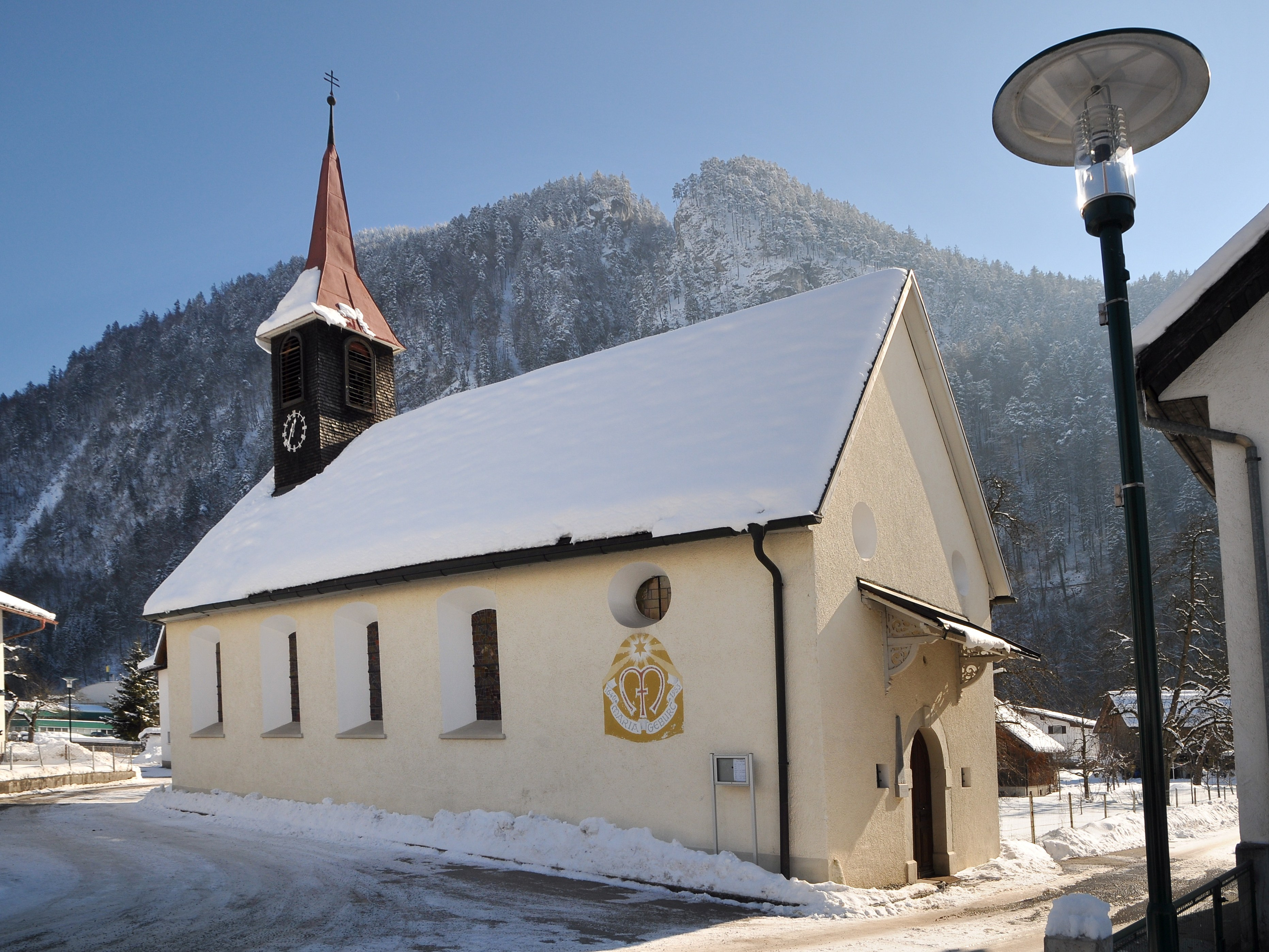

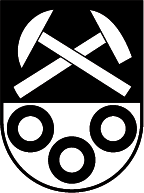
- Coat of arms

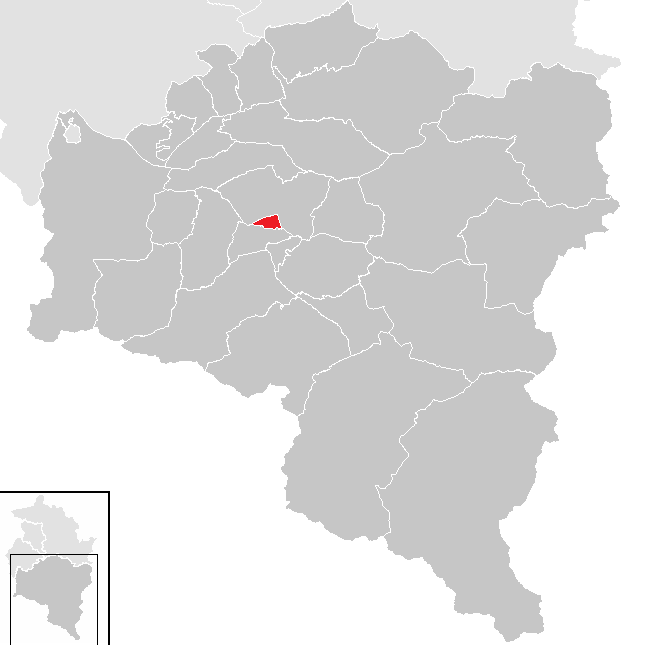
- Location in the district

- Location within Austria
- Coordinates: 47°07′00″N 09°50′00″E
- Country: Austria
- State: Vorarlberg
- District: Bludenz

Government
  - Mayor: Matthias Luger

Area
  - Total: 1.64 km^{2} (0.63 sq mi)
- Elevation: 600 m (2,000 ft)

Population (2018-01-01)
  - Total: 289
  - Density: 176/km^{2} (456/sq mi)
- Time zone: UTC+1 (CET)
  - Summer (DST): UTC+2 (CEST)
- Postal code: 6700
- Area code: 05552
- Vehicle registration: BZ
- Website: www.stallehr.at

Stallehr is a municipality in the district of Bludenz in the Austrian state of Vorarlberg.

== Population ==
Historical population
Year	Pop.	±%
1869	66	—
1880	79	+19.7%
1890	78	−1.3%
1900	77	−1.3%
1910	91	+18.2%
1923	88	−3.3%
1934	97	+10.2%
1939	105	+8.2%
1951	115	+9.5%
1961	158	+37.4%
1971	172	+8.9%
1981	199	+15.7%
1991	235	+18.1%
2001	272	+15.7%
2011	277	+1.8%

== Transport ==
Brunnenfeld-Stallehr railway station is a railway station on the Bludenz–Schruns railway line. It is served by the S4 service of Vorarlberg S-Bahn, operated by Montafonerbahn.
