= Schruns =

- Municipality
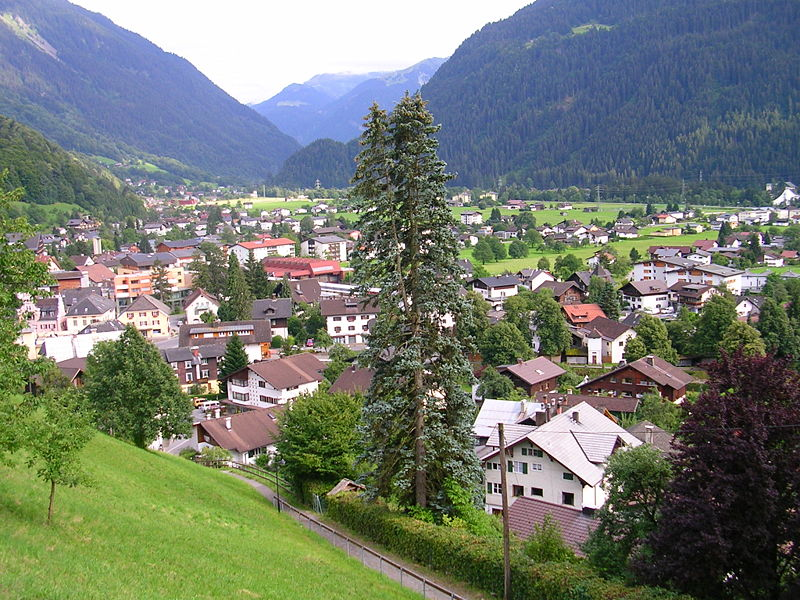
- July 2007 View of Schruns

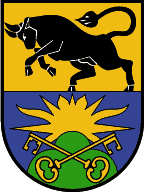
- Coat of arms

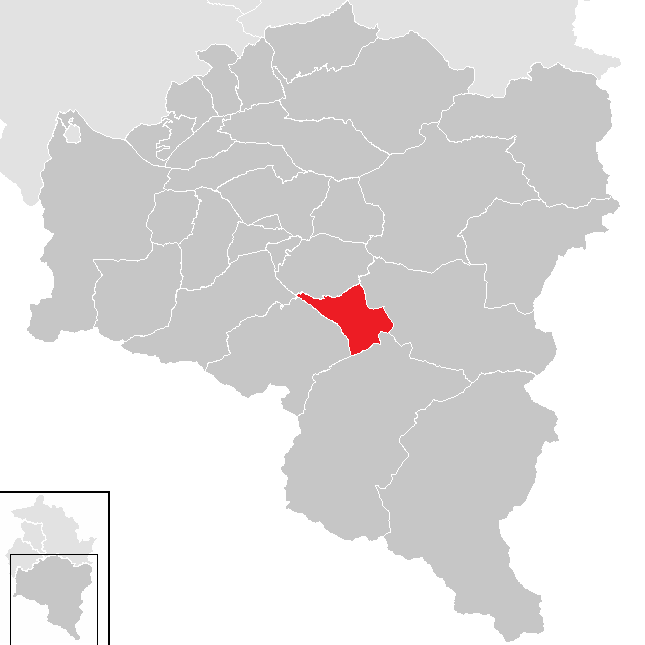
- Location in the district

- Location within Austria Schruns (Austria)
- Coordinates: 47°04′49″N 09°55′09″E
- Country: Austria
- State: Vorarlberg
- District: Bludenz

Government
  - Mayor: Jürgen Haller (Metnand fuer Schru)

Area
  - Total: 18.06 km^{2} (6.97 sq mi)
- Elevation: 700 m (2,300 ft)

Population (2018-01-01)
  - Total: 3,818
  - Density: 211.4/km^{2} (547.5/sq mi)
- Time zone: UTC+1 (CET)
  - Summer (DST): UTC+2 (CEST)
- Postal code: 6780
- Area code: 05556
- Vehicle registration: BZ
- Website: www.schruns.at

Schruns is a municipality in the Montafon valley (altitude 690 meters), in the Bludenz district of the westernmost Austrian state of Vorarlberg.

To the west is the famous Zimba mountain, often called the "Vorarlberger Matterhorn," which is very popular among climbers and hikers.

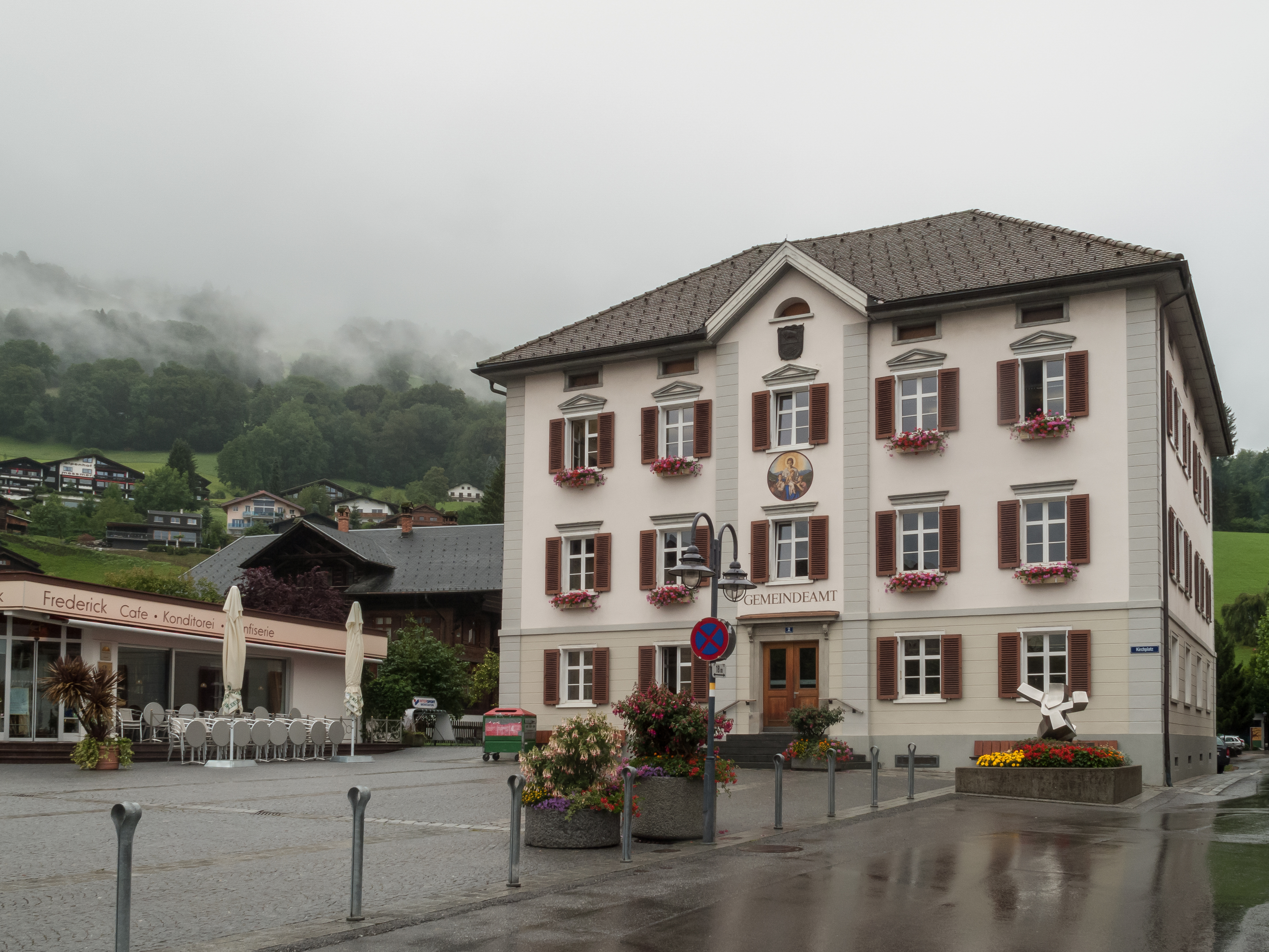
Schruns, townhall

== Geography ==
The Litz river, a tributary of the Ill river, flows through the town. A side valley, the Silbertal, stretches to the east of Schruns. The area has a high mountain massif accessible by train and ski-lifts.

To the north is the Bartholomäberg, to the south St. Gallenkirch, and to the west Tschagguns. The nearest larger municipality is Bludenz.

About 45.2 percent of the area is forested, with 18.1 percent mountainous.

== Transport ==
Schruns railway station is the southern terminus of the Bludenz–Schruns railway line (Montafonerbahn). Two other stations, Tschagguns and Kaltenbrunnen, are also located within the municipality of Schruns. All stations are served by the S4 regional train service of the Vorarlberg S-Bahn.

== Sports ==
Since 2012/13, Schruns has been part of the FIS Snowboard World Cup, which takes place annually in December. During the daytime, visitors can watch snowboard cross races up on the Hochjoch of the Silvretta Montafon ski area. In the evening, concerts are held in Schruns.

Schruns is a hotspot for mountain biking and trail running. For more than ten years, Schruns has hosted the M3 Montafon Bike Marathon with over 500 bikers.

Historical population
Year	Pop.	±%
1869	1,394	—
1880	1,330	−4.6%
1890	1,462	+9.9%
1900	1,503	+2.8%
1910	1,663	+10.6%
1923	1,689	+1.6%
1934	2,021	+19.7%
1939	2,218	+9.7%
1951	2,717	+22.5%
1961	3,304	+21.6%
1971	3,616	+9.4%
1981	3,724	+3.0%
1991	3,843	+3.2%
2001	3,715	−3.3%
2011	3,701	−0.4%

== Notable people ==
In the early 1920s Schruns was the favorite ski resort of Ernest Hemingway. He wintered there with his first wife, Hadley, and oldest son, who was then just an infant; a chapter in his book A Moveable Feast includes several pages describing lodging and skiing there in the 1920s. It was there that he revised the manuscript of The Sun Also Rises. In Hemingway's classic story "The Snows of Kilimanjaro" the third scene in the first flashback sequence recounts memories of Schruns. These images of snow and glacier skiing stand in stark contrast to the description of the Serengeti Plain in the main story and anticipate the coming journey to the snows of Kilimanjaro.

- Ernst Rüdiger Starhemberg died here in 1956
- Richard von Coudenhove-Kalergi died here in 1972
- Georg Margreitter, footballer for Grasshopper Club Zürich, born in 1988
- Elisabeth Schwarzkopf lived in the village in her last years and died there in 2006
- Eleonore Schönborn, Gräfin von Schönborn died here in 2022
