= Schruns railway station =

Railway station in Vorarlberg, Austria

Schruns
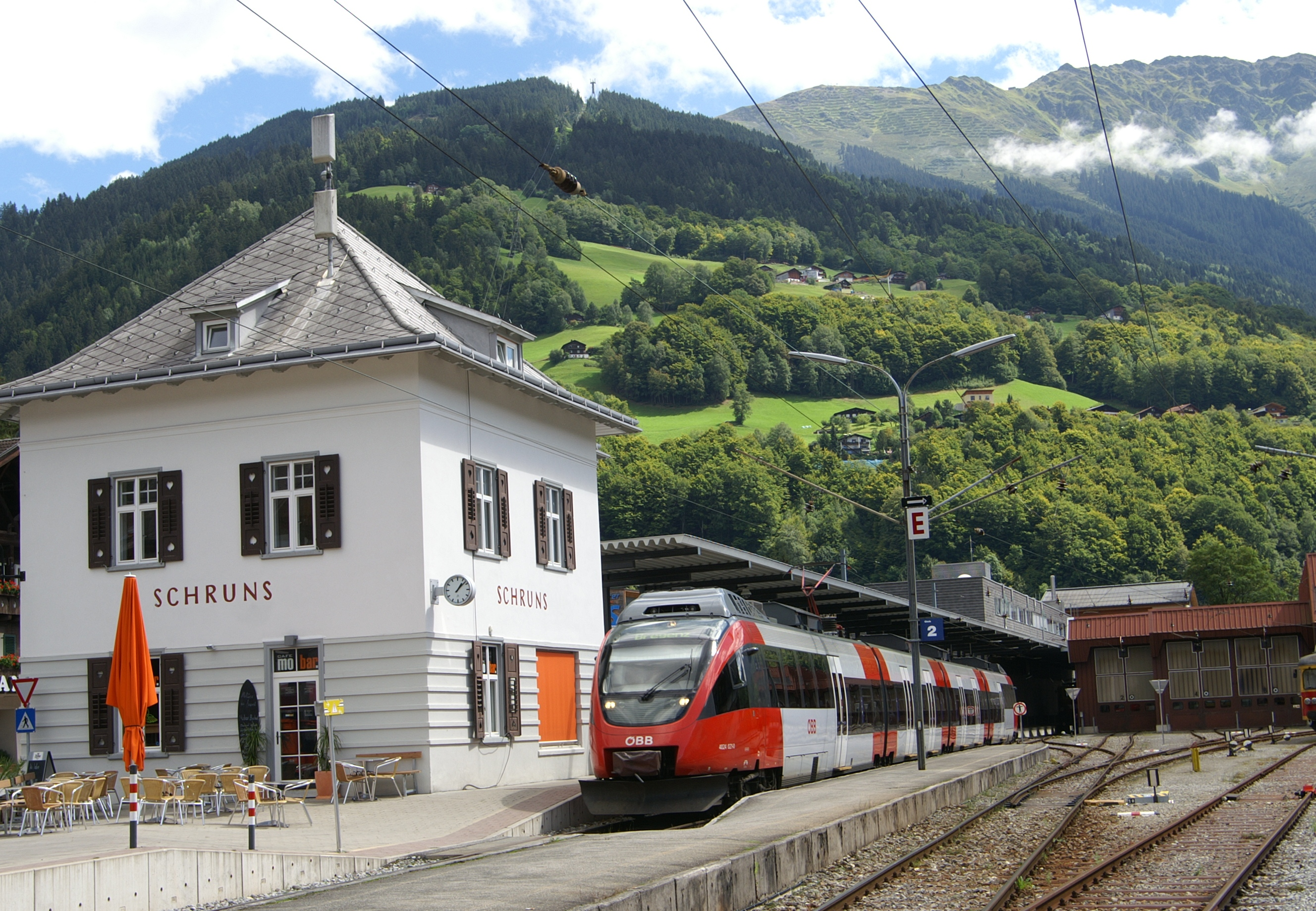
- The station building and ÖBB Bombardier Talent trainset.

General information
- Location: Bahnhofstrasse 19; 6780 Schruns; Austria
- Coordinates: 47°04′46.6392″N 09°55′2.9136″E
- Elevation: 681 m (AA)
- Owner: Montafonerbahn
- Operator: Montafonerbahn
- Line: Bludenz–Schruns railway

History
- Opened: 1905

Services
| Preceding station | Vorarlberg S-Bahn | Following station |
|---|---|---|
| Tschagguns towards Bludenz | S4 | Terminus |
Location
- Location within Austria Location within Vorarlberg

Schruns railway station (German: Bahnhof Schruns) serves the city of Schruns in the Montafon Valley, located in the Bludenz district of the Austrian federal state of Vorarlberg. Opened in 1905 and owned by the Montafonerbahn (MBS), it is the terminal station of the Bludenz–Schruns railway.

== Services ==
As of the December 2023 timetable change, the following regional train services exist:

- Vorarlberg S-Bahn S4: half-hourly service to Bludenz.

== See also ==
- History of rail transport in Austria
- Rail transport in Austria
