= Rail transport in Austria =

Austria
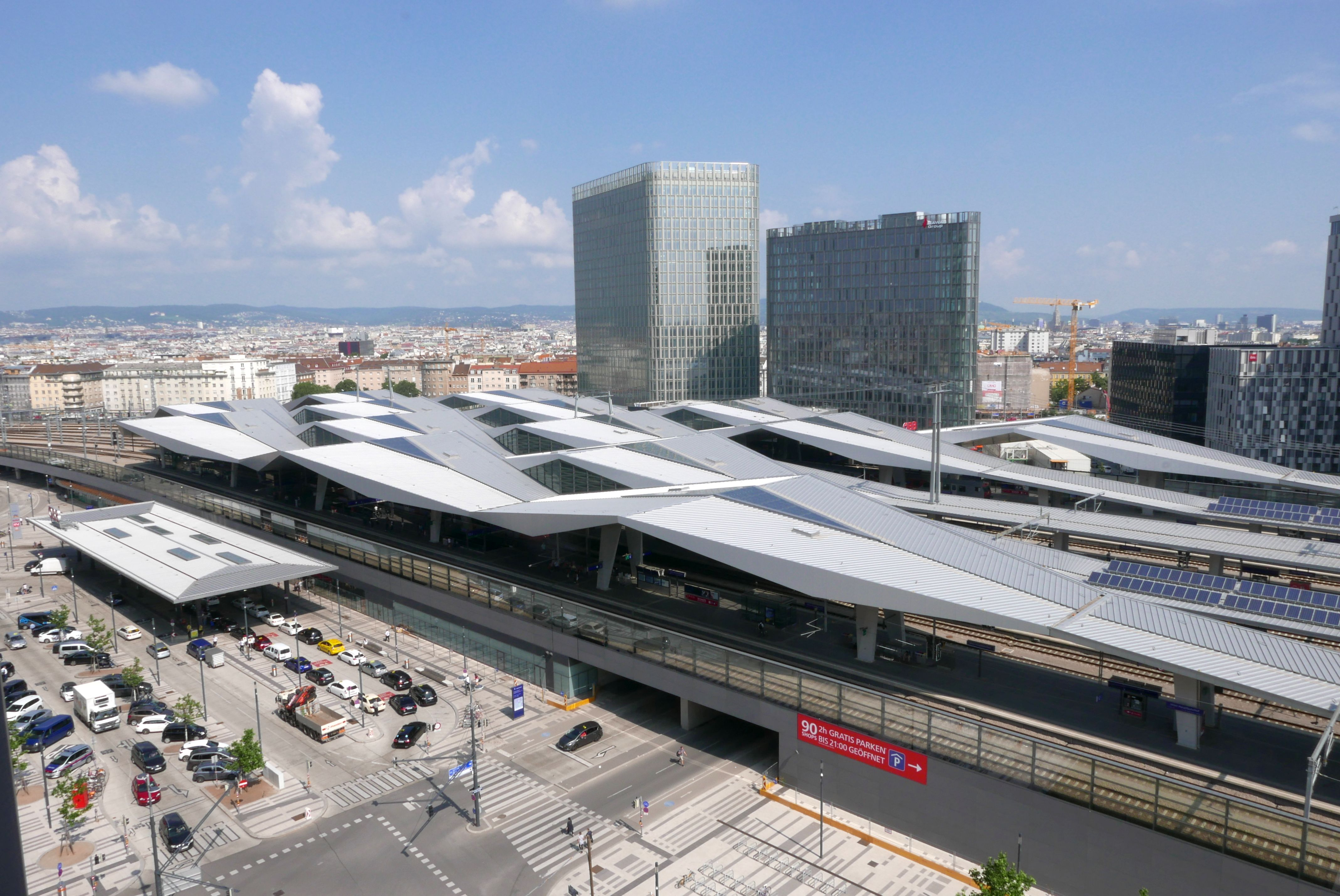
- View of Vienna Main Station

Operation
- National railway: ÖBB
- Major operators: ÖBB; Westbahn

Statistics
- Passenger-distance: 1,510 km (940 mi) (2022)

System length
- Total: 6,123 kilometres (3,805 mi)
- Electrified: 3,523 kilometres (2,189 mi)
- High-speed: 233 km (145 mi)

Track gauge
- Main: 1,435 mm / 4 ft 8 1/2 in standard gauge
- High-speed: standard gauge

Electrification
- 15 kV 16,7 Hz: Main network

Features
Map
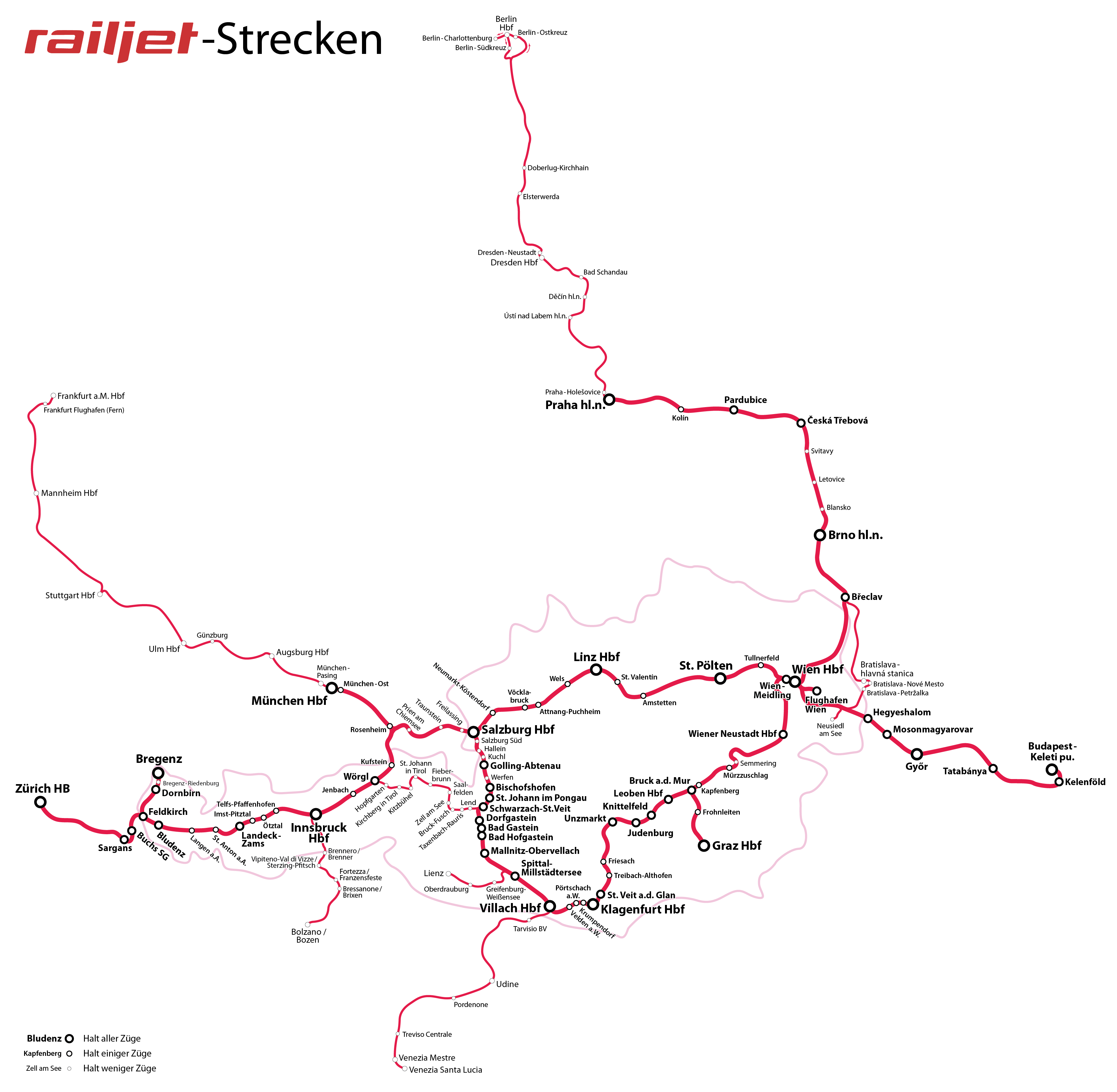
- Map of the main network in Austria as of 2020.

Rail transport in Austria is mainly provided by Austria's national rail transport company, the Austrian Federal Railways (German: Österreichische Bundesbahnen, ÖBB), which also manages rail transport in Liechtenstein. The Austrian railway network has a length of 6,123 km (3,805 mi), 3,523 km (2,189 mi) of which are electrified. Most lines are in 1,435 mm (4 ft 8 1/2 in) standard gauge, while especially in the Alpine region there are several narrow-gauge railway lines and funiculars.

Within the European Union, Austria is among the leaders regarding the distance traveled by rail per inhabitant and year: 1,510 km (940 mi) in 2022. It was ranked fifth among national European rail systems in the 2017 European Railway Performance Index.

Austria is a member of the International Union of Railways (UIC). The UIC Country Code for Austria is 81.

== Network ==
Detail from the map of Europe's high-speed rail lines, showing the Austrian high-speed rail network (colored) and maximum speeds.
Max operational speed 310-320 km/h
Max operational speed 270-300 km/h
Max operational speed 240-260 km/h
Max operational speed 200-230 km/h
Under construction for max operational speed ≥ 200 km/h
Max operational speed < 200 km/h

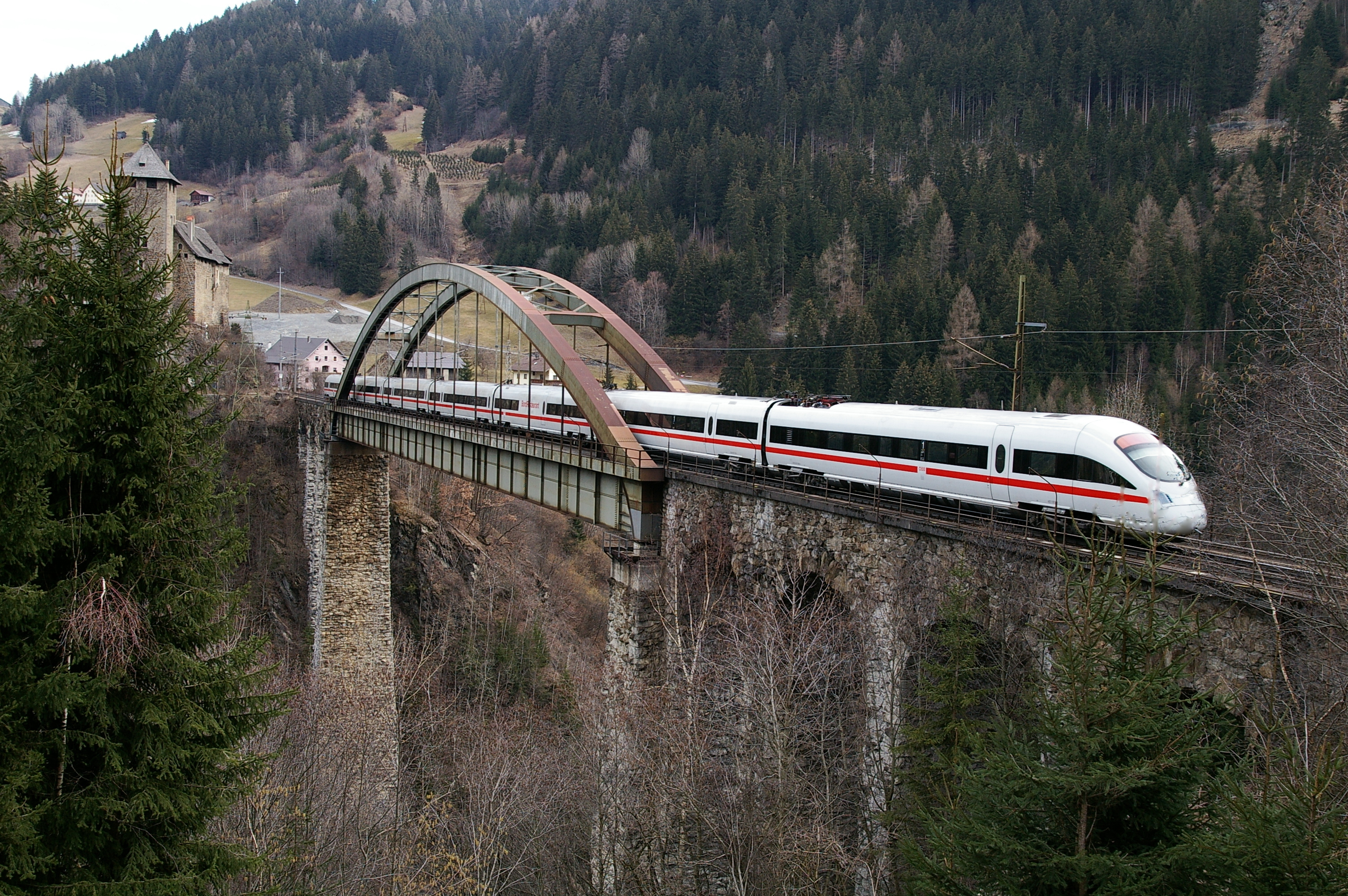
An ICE T on the Trisanna Bridge, on the Arlberg Railway line

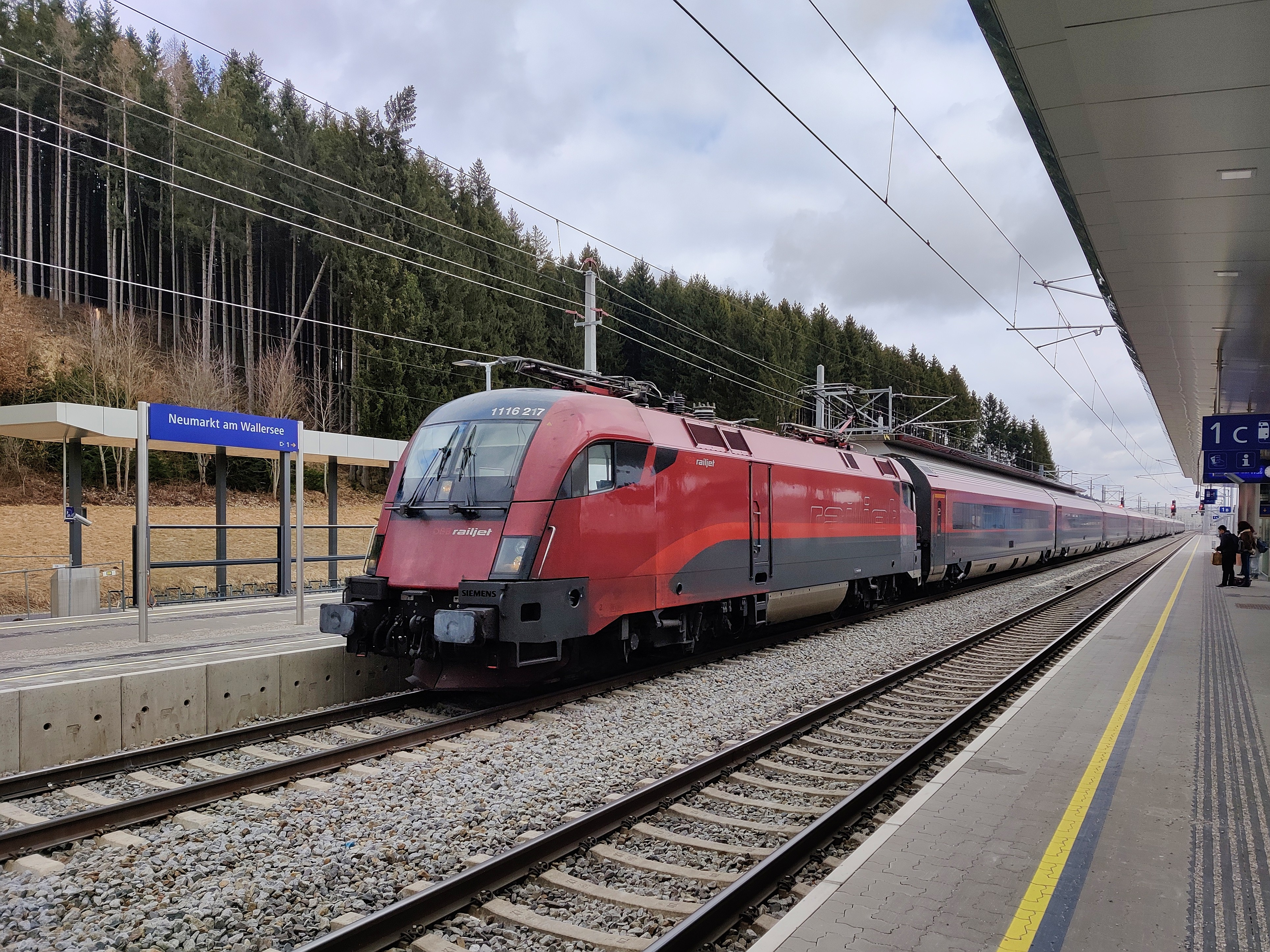
Railjet is a domestic and international long-distance train

The Austrian network, aside from the principal rail system, also enfolds some funiculars, rack railways and several heritage railways mainly derived from part of disused lines. Some secondary lines are set up in narrow gauge.

=== Standard gauge railways ===
The following is an alphabetical list of standard gauge railway lines in Austria:

- Arlberg railway
- Ausserfern Railway
- Bludenz–Schruns railway
- Brenner Railway
- Bruck an der Mur–Leoben railway
- Bürmoos–Ostermiething railway
- Donauuferbahn (Vienna)
- Donauuferbahn (Wachau)
- Drava Valley Railway
- Eastern Railway
- Enns Valley Railway
- Feldkirch–Buchs railway
- Floridsdorfer Hochbahn
- Franz-Josefs-Bahn
- Gänserndorf–Marchegg railway line
- Győr–Sopron–Ebenfurth railway
- Innsbruck bypass
- Köflach railway line
- Koralm Railway
- Laaer Ostbahn
- Lower Inn Valley Railway
- Marchegger Ostbahn
- Mittenwald Railway
- Neusiedler Seebahn
- North railway line
- Northwest railway line
- Pannonia Railway
- Parndorf–Bratislava railway line
- Pinzgauer Lokalbahn
- Pyhrn railway line
- Rosen Valley Railway
- Rudolf Railway
- Salzburg–Lamprechtshausen railway
- Salzburg-Tyrol Railway
- Salzkammergut railway line
- Schneeberg Railway
- Semmering railway
- Sopron–Kőszeg railway
- Southern Railway
- Spielfeld-Straß–Trieste railway
- St. Margrethen–Lauterach line
- Suburban line (Vienna)
- Tauern Railway
- Verbindungsbahn (Vienna)
- Vienna–Baden Railway
- Vorarlberg Railway
- Wels–Passau railway
- Western Railway

Due to the course of the Austria–Germany border and mountainous terrain, the shortest railway line between Innsbruck (Tyrol) and Salzburg (Salzburg state) runs over German territory. This railway corridor, known as the Deutsches Eck (lit. 'German corner'), consists of two railway lines, Kufstein–Rosenheim and Rosenheim–Salzburg, which are both located almost entirely in Germany.

The Lower Inn Valley Railway and Brenner Railway represent an important north-south corridor for trains running between Germany and Italy via Austria. To shorten travel time, the 55 km (34 mi) long Brenner Base Tunnel is currently being built between Innsbruck and Franzensfeste (Fortezza), South Tyrol. Trains will run with a speed up to 250 km/h (160 mph) through this tunnel. It will be only slightly shorter than the world's longest railway tunnel, the Gotthard Base Tunnel in Switzerland.

Another newly opened railway tunnel is the 32.9 km (20.4 mi) long Koralm Tunnel, which has shortened travel time between Klagenfurt and Graz.

==== Rail links to neighbouring countries ====
- Czech Republic – voltage change to 25 kV 50 Hz AC
- Germany – same voltage 15 kV, 16.7 Hz AC
- Hungary – voltage change to 25 kV 50 Hz AC
- Italy – voltage change to 3 kV DC
- Liechtenstein – same voltage 15 kV, 16.7 Hz AC
- Slovakia – voltage change to 25 kV 50 Hz AC
- Slovenia – voltage change to 3 kV DC
- Switzerland – same voltage 15 kV, 16.7 Hz AC, but different pantographs

=== Narrow gauge railways ===
In Austria, many narrow gauge railways were constructed due to the difficult mountainous terrain. Many survive to this day as a common carrier or a heritage railway.

==== Narrow-gauge links to adjacent countries ====
- Switzerland – 750 mm / 2 ft 5 1/2 in gauge:
  - The International Rhine Regulation Railway, a former industrial railway (now a heritage railway) along and across the Alpine Rhine

=== Funiculars ===
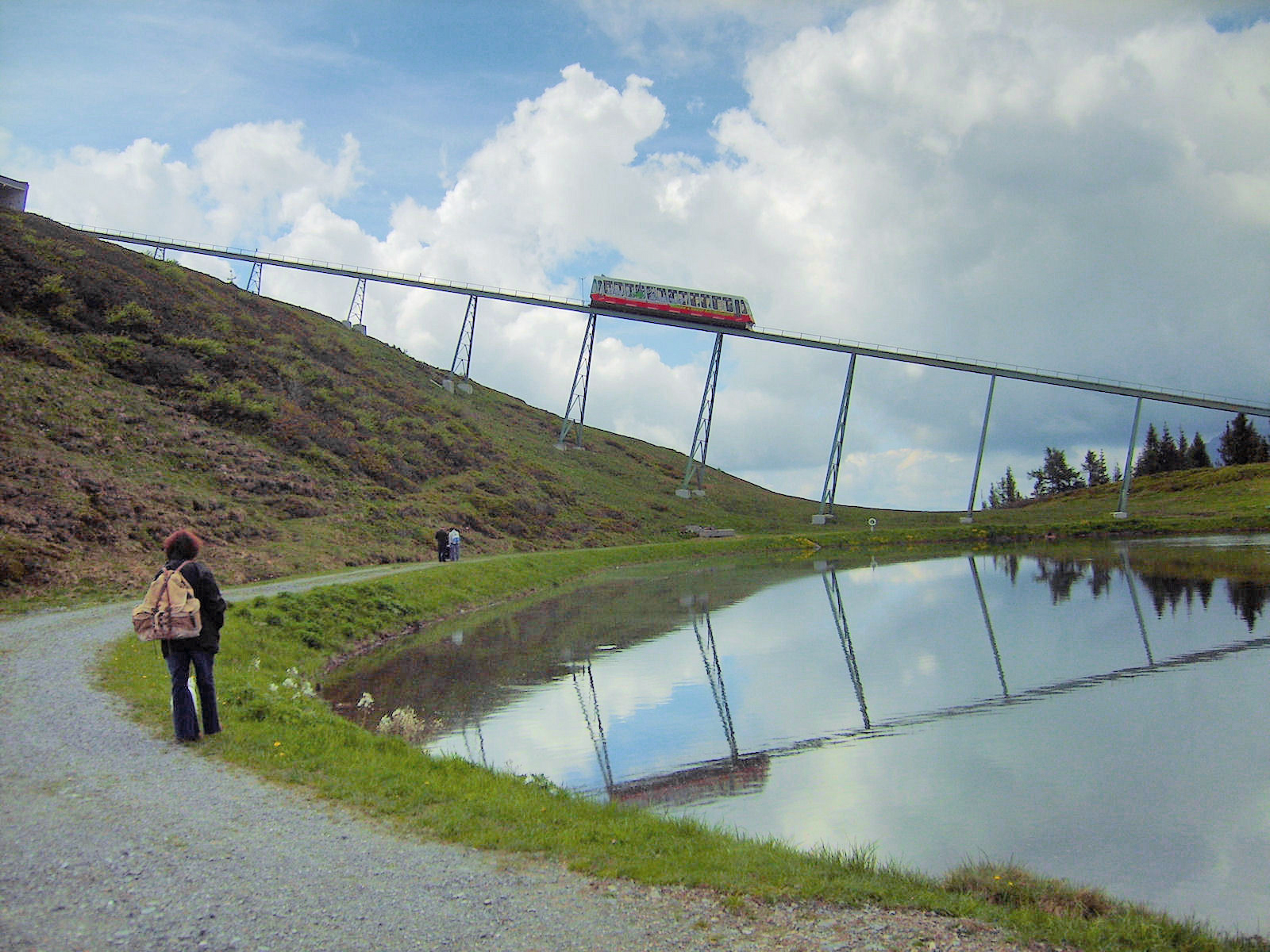
The Hartkaiserbahn funicular near Ellmau

== Operators ==
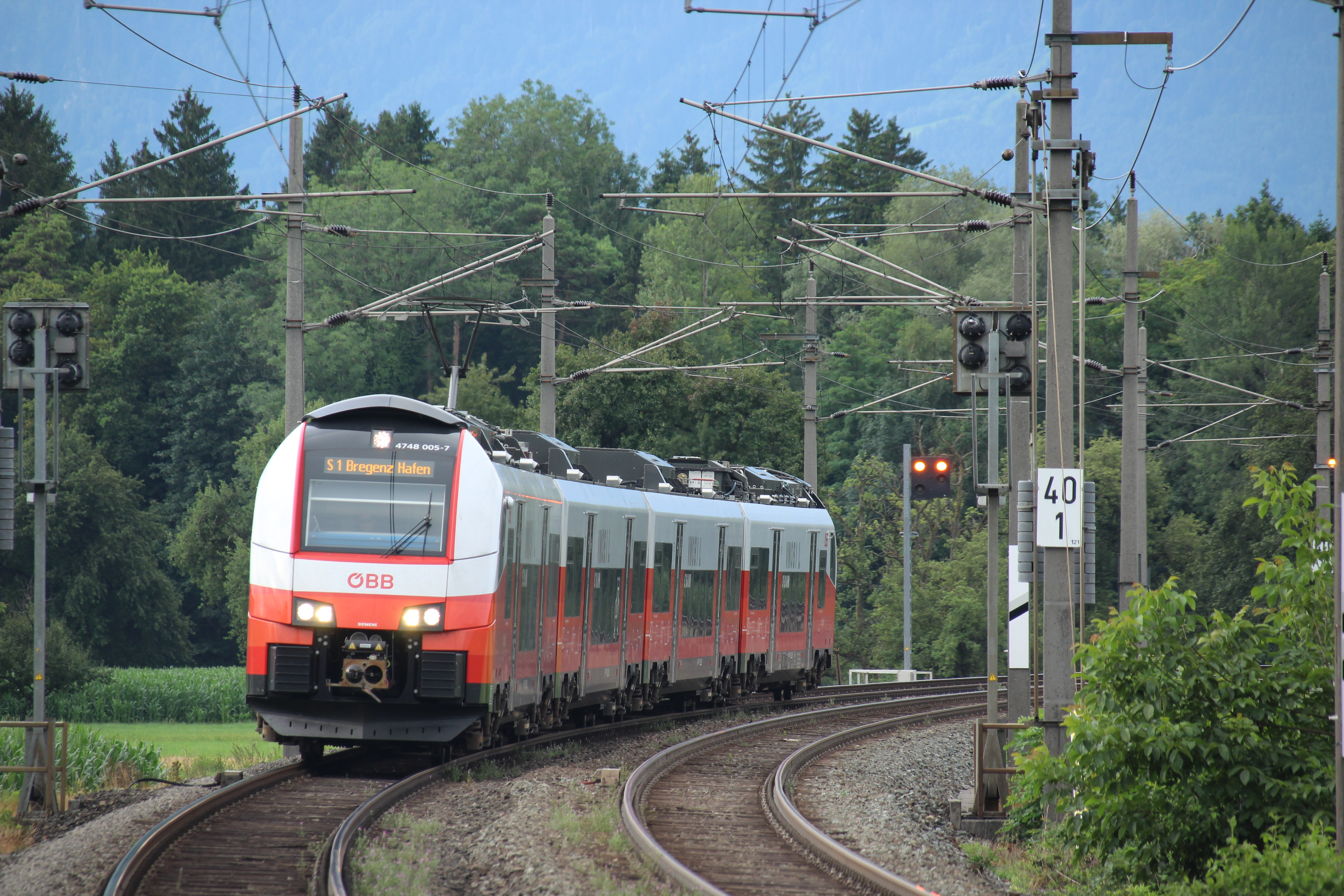
S-Bahn train (Siemens Desiro) operated by ÖBB

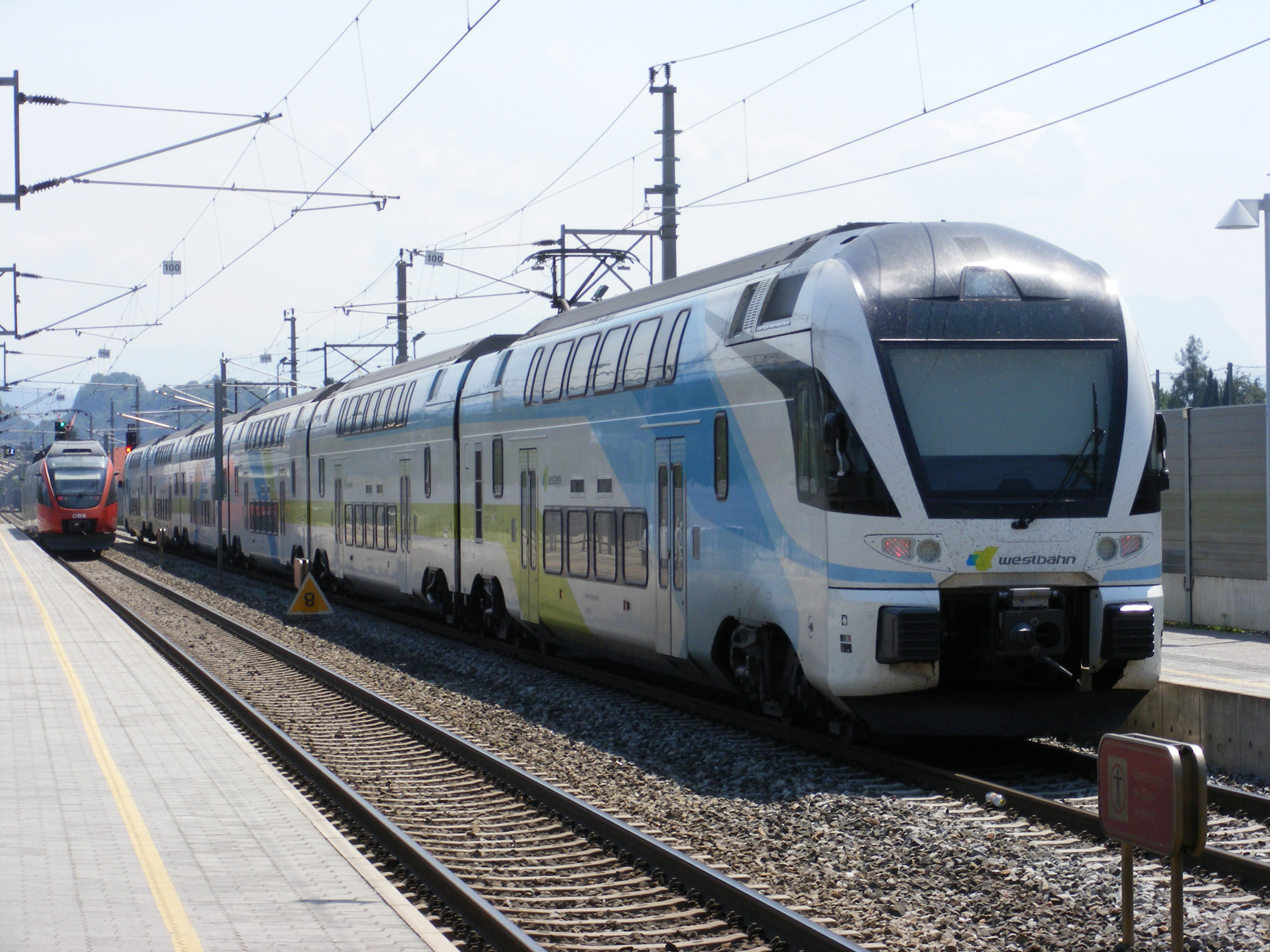
ÖBB Bombardier Talent and Westbahn Stadler KISS trains

ÖBB and Westbahn are the main operators on Austria's railway network. In addition, the German Deutsche Bahn (DB) and the Czech České dráhy (ČD) also operate passenger train services to destinations in Austria.

=== Austrian Federal Railways ===
Austrian Federal Railways (Österreichische Bundesbahnen, ÖBB) is the national railway company. It owns a ca. 5,000 km (3,100 mi) long network and operates domestic and international long-distance passenger trains (e.g., Railjet, Transalpin), most urban commuter trains, known as S-Bahn (S), as well as Interregio (IR), Regional-Express (REX) and regional trains (R). ÖBB also runs Intercity-Express (ICE) trains to Germany using Class 4011 (ICE T) tilting trains. In addition, ÖBB jointly operates the City Airport Train (CAT) to Vienna Airport. ÖBB also runs its own brand of night trains to other European countries, branded Nightjet (NJ). The company also owns and operates the Feldkirch–Buchs railway line, which links Austria and Switzerland via the Principality of Liechtenstein.

=== Westbahn ===
Westbahn operates express trains over Austria's Western Railway line. It includes both domestic and international passenger services.

=== Other companies ===
- Achenseebahn runs steam locomotive hauled trains on the 1,000 mm (3 ft 3 3/8 in) metre gauge rack railway line between Jenbach and Achensee, Tyrol
- Graz-Köflacher Bahn und Busbetrieb (GKB) runs the Köflach railway line between Graz Hauptbahnhof and Köflach, Styria
- Montafonerbahn operates a 1,435 mm (4 ft 8 1/2 in) standard gauge line between Bludenz and Schruns in the Montafon Valley, Vorarlberg
- NÖVOG runs the 760 mm (2 ft 5 15/16 in) gauge Mariazell Railway between St. Pölten Hauptbahnhof and Mariazell
- Pöstlingbergbahn operates trams on the 900 mm (2 ft 11 7/16 in) gauge line from the main square (Hauptplatz) in Linz to Pöstlingberg
- Raaberbahn, or Győr–Sopron–Ebenfurti Vasút (GYSEV), operates the Győr–Sopron–Ebenfurth railway (Győr–Ebenfurth) and the Neusiedler Seebahn (Neusiedl am See–Fertőszentmiklós) across the Austria–Hungary border, as well as other lines in Hungary
- Schafbergbahn, a 1,000 mm (3 ft 3 3/8 in) metre gauge rack railway between St. Wolfgang (Upper Austria) and Schafberg Salzburg), is operated by the SchafbergBahn und Wolfgangsee Schifffahrt (SLB)
- Salzburg AG operates the 1,435 mm (4 ft 8 1/2 in) standard gauge Salzburg–Lamprechtshausen railway (Salzburg Hauptbahnhof–Lamprechtshausen) and Bürmoos–Ostermiething railway (Bürmoos–Ostermiething) and 760 mm (2 ft 5 15/16 in) gauge Pinzgauer Lokalbahn from Zell am See to Krimml.
- Schneebergbahn, a 1,000 mm (3 ft 3 3/8 in) metre gauge rack railway between Puchberg and Schneeberg in Lower Austria, is operated by Niederösterreichische Schneebergbahn GmbH (lit. 'Lower Austrian Schneeberg Railway Company Ltd.')
- Wiener Lokalbahnen operates the 1,435 mm (4 ft 8 1/2 in) standard gauge Badner Bahn in the Greater Vienna area, between Vienna Opera and Baden bei Wien
- Zillertalbahn runs a 760 mm (2 ft 5 15/16 in) gauge line in the Ziller Valley (Tyrol) between Jenbach and Mayrhofen

=== Freight ===
Cargo trains are operated by Rail Cargo Austria (RCA).

== Urban railways ==
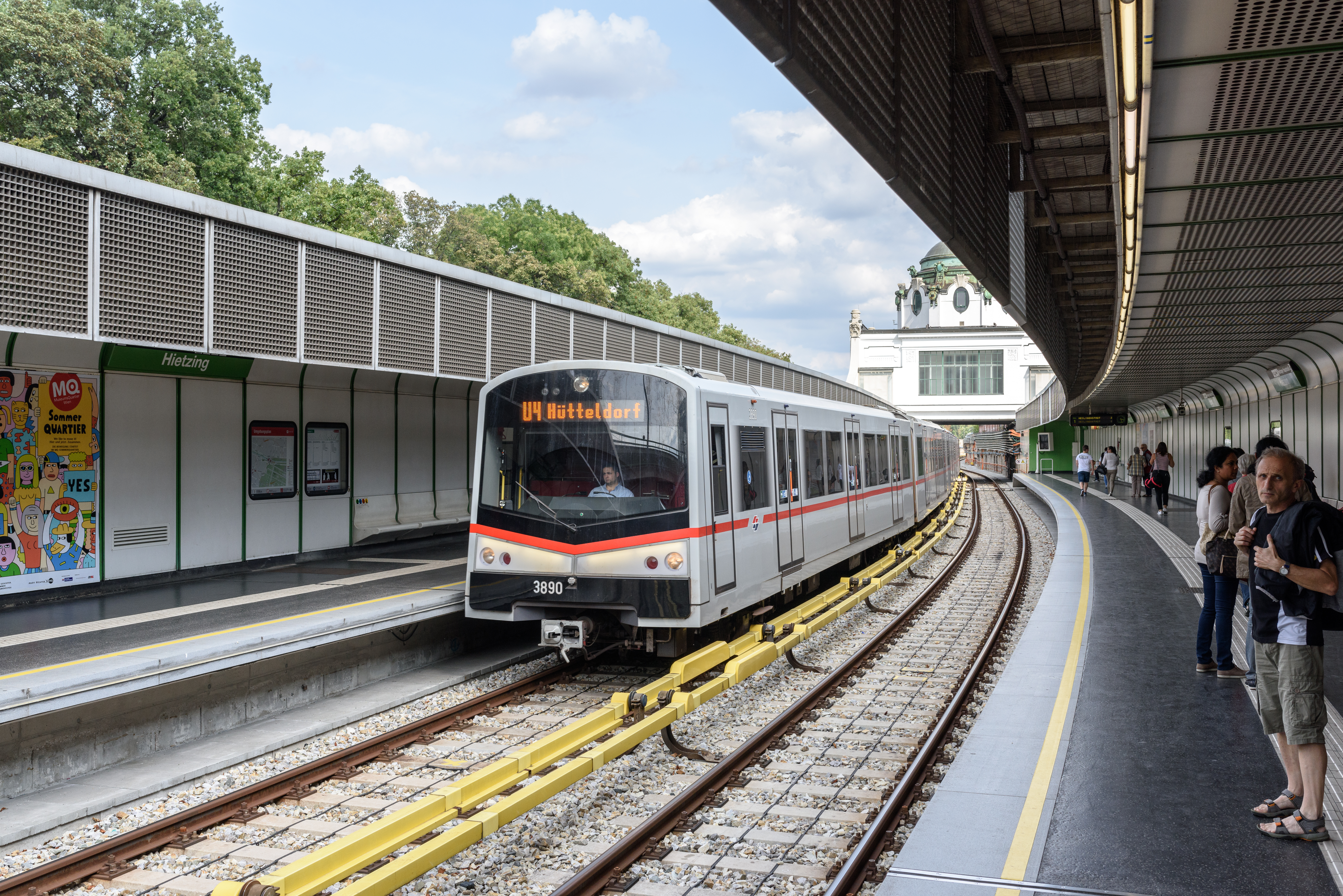
Vienna subway (U-Bahn)

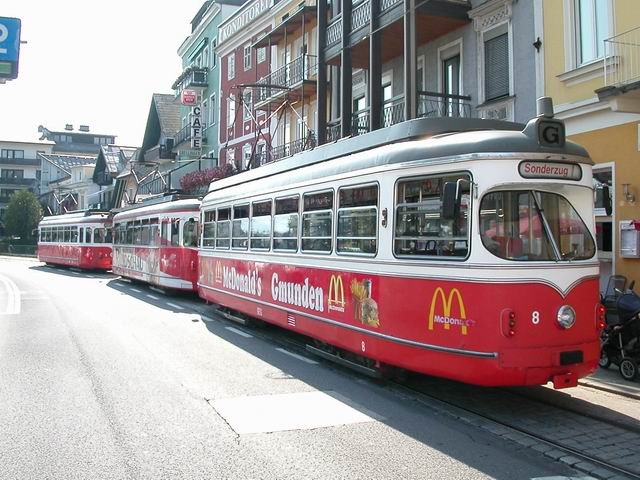
Some tramways in Gmunden

Urban railway services are known as S-Bahn (S) and U-Bahn (U). Regional trains are called Regionalzug (R) in Austria.

- Vienna counts a system of S-Bahn, U-Bahn, and a large tramway network (also see Transport in Vienna).
- Graz counts a regional S-Bahn, an extended tramway network and a funicular.
- Linz counts a regional S-Bahn and a tramway network including the Pöstlingbergbahn.
- Salzburg counts a regional S-Bahn (with some services to Germany) and a funicular.
- Innsbruck counts a regional S-Bahn, with some services to Germany and Italy, a tramway network (including the Stubaitalbahn) and a funicular.
- Klagenfurt counts a regional S-Bahn.
- The federal state of Vorarlberg counts a regional S-Bahn, with services to Germany, Liechtenstein and Switzerland. Some services are also part of the Bodensee S-Bahn.
- The small town of Gmunden in Upper Austria counts a tramway line, which since 2018 is linked to the railway line to Vorchdorf.
- The village of Serfaus in Tyrol, with the U-Bahn Serfaus, is sometimes considered as the smallest town with a subway in the world.

== History ==
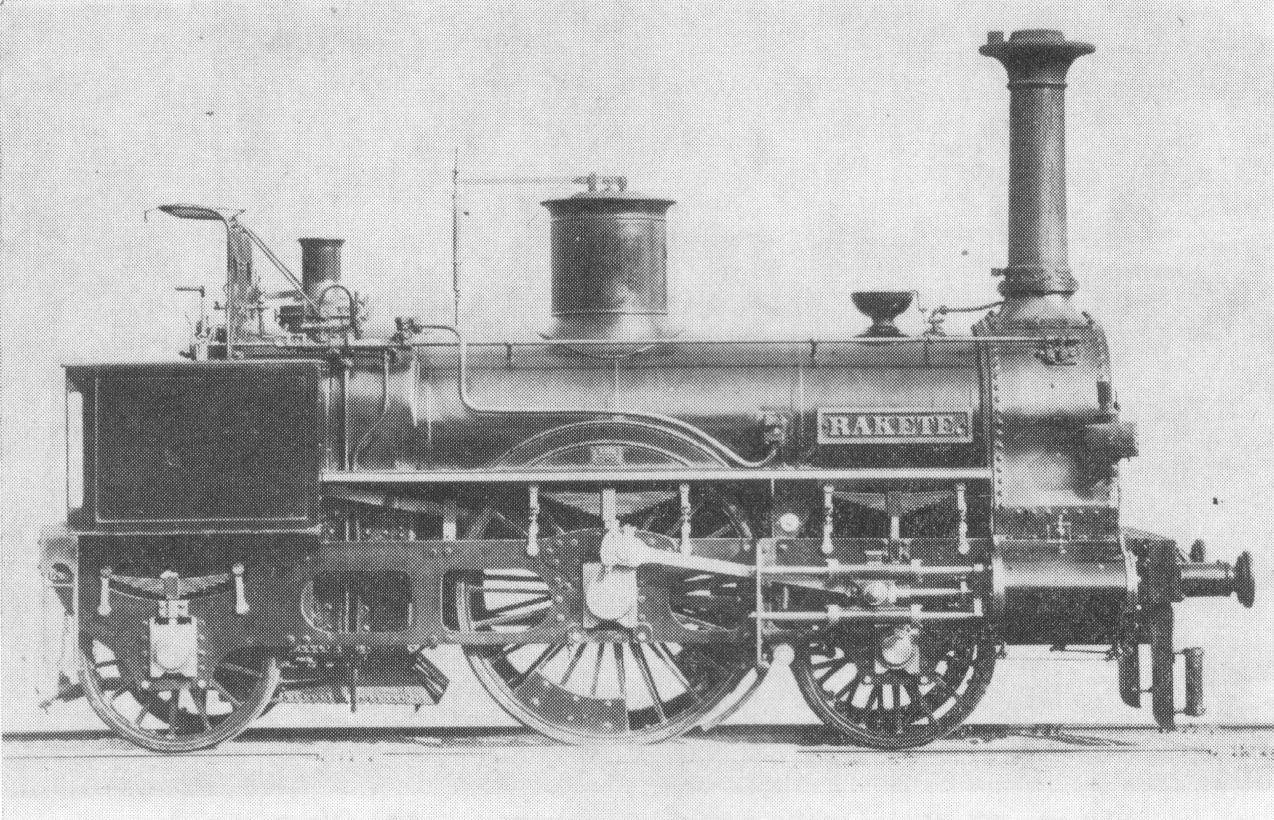
The Rakete (Rocket) of the Kaiser-Ferdinands-Nordbahn

The history of Austrian rail transport starts with the Reisszug, a private, horse-drawn funicular serving Hohensalzburg Fortress. Built at the end of the 15th century and first documented in 1515, it is the oldest known funicular in the world, and possibly the oldest existing railway line.

In the 19th century, after building of several horse tramways, the Nordbahn line Vienna–Břeclav opened in 1837. The Imperial Royal Austrian State Railways (Kaiserlich-königliche österreichische Staatsbahnen, kkStB), a company serving the Austrian side of Austria-Hungary, was created in 1884 and in 1923, some years after the dissolution of the empire, the national company BBÖ (Bundesbahnen Österreich) was founded.

Following the Anschluss of Austria to National-socialist Germany in 1938, the BBÖ were taken over by the Deutsche Reichsbahn. After the end of World War II, the Austrian federal railways were re-installed in 1945, soon under the name of Österreichische Bundesbahnen (ÖBB).

In 1998 the market was liberalised and had one of the highest degrees of market openness in the EU according to the 2011 Rail Liberalisation Index, although the market share of ÖBB remains above 90% for passenger rail.

== See also ==
- 365-Euro-Ticket
- Klimaticket
- List of busiest railway stations in Austria
- List of mountain railways in Austria
- List of named passenger trains of Austria
- Railway stations in Austria
- S-Bahn in Austria
- Transport in Austria*
