= 2016 in Europe =

This is a list of events that took place in Europe in 2016.

== Incumbents ==
=== Albania ===
(Albania)

=== Andorra ===
(Andorra)

=== Azerbaijan ===
(Azerbaijan)

=== Belarus ===
(Belarus)

=== Belgium ===
(Belgium)

=== Bosnia and Herzegovina ===
(Bosnia and Herzegovina)

=== Bulgaria ===
(Bulgaria)

=== Croatia ===
(Croatia)

=== Czech Republic ===
(Czech Republic)

=== Cyprus ===
(Cyprus)

=== Denmark ===
(Denmark)

=== Estonia ===
(Estonia)

=== European Union ===
- President of the European Commission: Jean-Claude Juncker
- President of the Parliament: Martin Schulz
- President of the European Council: Donald Tusk
- Presidency of the Council of the EU:
  - Netherlands (January–July)
  - Slovakia (July–December)

=== Finland ===
(Finland)

=== France ===
(France)

=== Germany ===
(Germany)

=== Georgia ===
(Georgia (country))

=== Greece ===
(Greece)

=== Hungary ===
(Hungary)

=== Iceland ===
(Iceland)

=== Ireland ===
(Republic of Ireland)

=== Italy ===
(Italy)

=== Latvia ===
(Latvia)

=== Liechtenstein ===
(Liechtenstein)

=== Lithuania ===
(Lithuania)

=== Luxembourg ===
(Luxembourg)

=== Malta ===
(Malta)

=== Moldova ===
(Moldova)

=== Monaco ===
(Monaco)

=== Montenegro ===
(Montenegro)

=== Netherlands ===
(Netherlands)

=== North Macedonia ===
(North Macedonia)

=== Norway ===
(Norway)

=== Poland ===
(Poland)

=== Portugal ===
(Portugal)

=== Romania ===
(Romania)

=== Russia ===
(Russia)

=== San Marino ===
(San Marino)

=== Serbia ===
(Serbia)

=== Slovakia ===
(Slovakia)

=== Slovenia ===
(Slovenia)

=== Spain ===
(Spain)

=== Sweden ===
(Sweden)

=== Switzerland ===
(Switzerland)

=== Turkey ===
(Turkey)

=== Ukraine ===
(Ukraine)

=== United Kingdom ===
(United Kingdom)

=== Vatican City ===
(Vatican City)

== Events ==
=== January ===
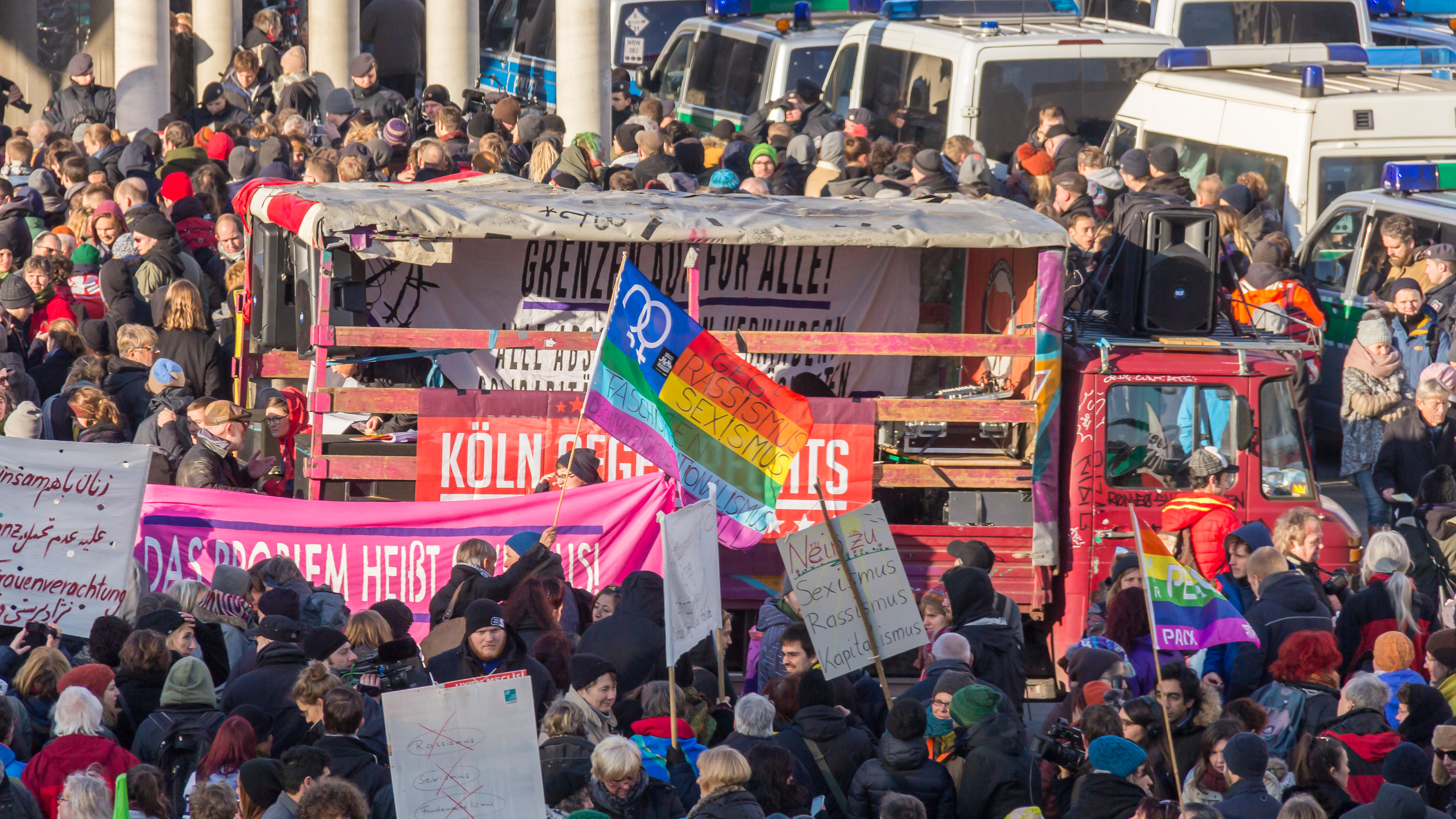
Protest in Cologne against New Year's Eve sexual assaults

- 1 January
  - The Netherlands takes over the rotating presidency of the EU Council from Luxembourg.
  - San Sebastián (Spain) and Wrocław (Poland) are named European Capitals of Culture.
- 8 January – 32 people, including 22 asylum seekers, are arrested in connection to a series of apparently co-ordinated sexual assaults and thefts in the German city of Cologne on New Year's Eve.
- 9 January
  - Tens of thousands of people take to the streets in cities around Poland to protest against a new law giving the government control of state media.
  - 14 people are injured and the government building is set alight as opposition protests in Kosovo's capital Pristina turn violent.
- 12 January – A suspected suicide bombing kills at least 11 people and injures 14 in Istanbul's Sultanahmet Square.
- 24 January – Marcelo Rebelo de Sousa is elected President of Portugal.
- 28 January – A boat carrying Iraqi Kurdish migrants sinks off the Greek island of Samos, killing at least 24 people, including several children, with 11 others missing.
- 30 January – A massive pile-up involving 70 vehicles, including a bus and several lorries, kills four people and injures 30 on A1 motorway in western Slovenia.

=== February ===
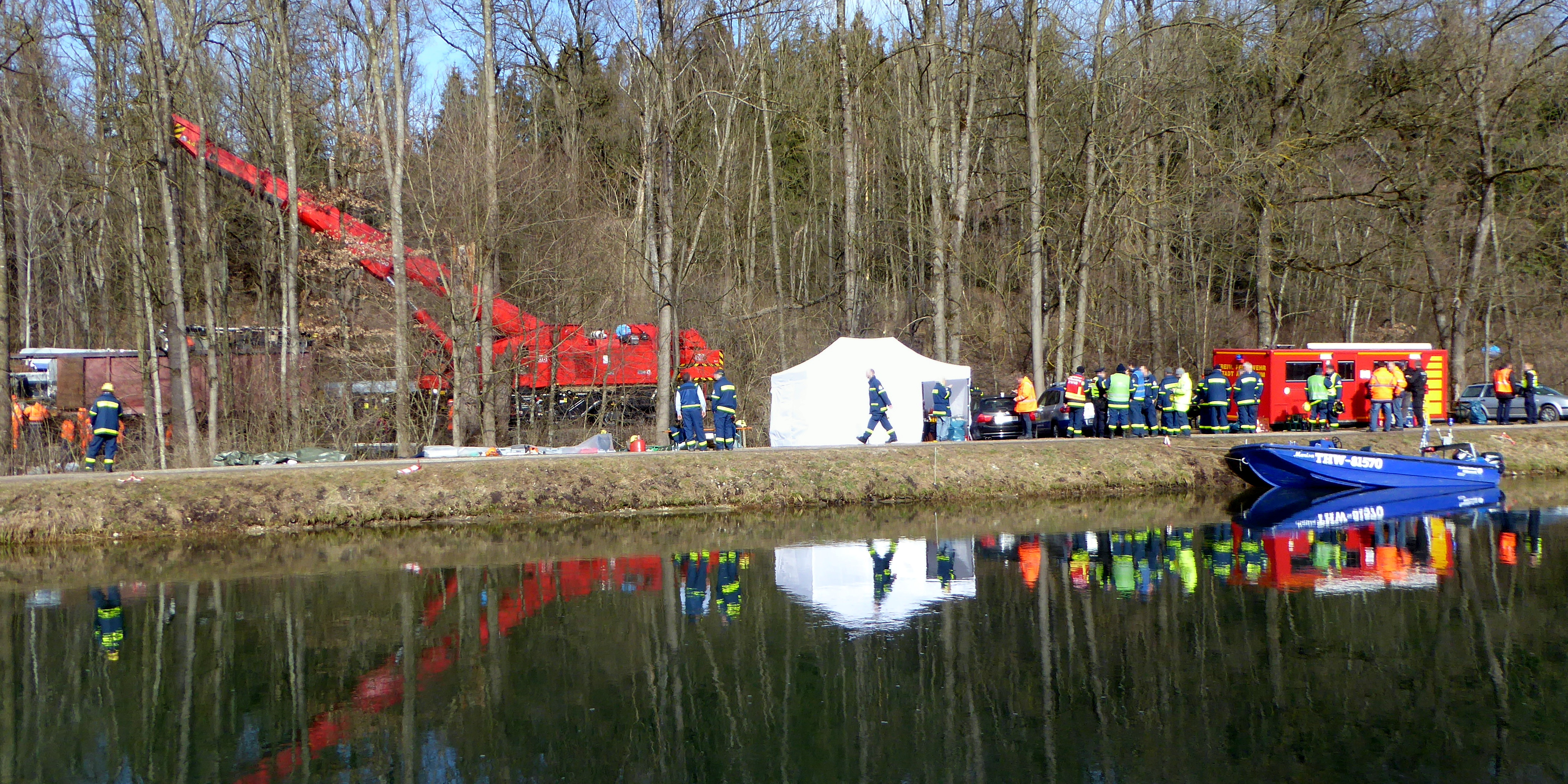
Rescue teams on the site of Bad Aibling rail accident

- Turkish president Recep Tayyip Erdoğan threatens to send the millions of refugees in Turkey to EU member states, saying: "We can open the doors to Greece and Bulgaria anytime and we can put the refugees on buses ... So how will you deal with refugees if you don't get a deal? Kill the refugees?"
- 9 February – Two passenger trains collide in the German town of Bad Aibling, with 11 people killed and 82 injured.
- 12 February – Pope Francis and Patriarch Kirill sign an Ecumenical Declaration in the first such meeting since the East–West Schism in 1054.
- 15 February – Bosnia and Herzegovina formally applies to join the European Union.
- 28 February – A total of 36 people are presumed dead following three explosions at a coal mine in Vorkuta, Russia.

=== March ===
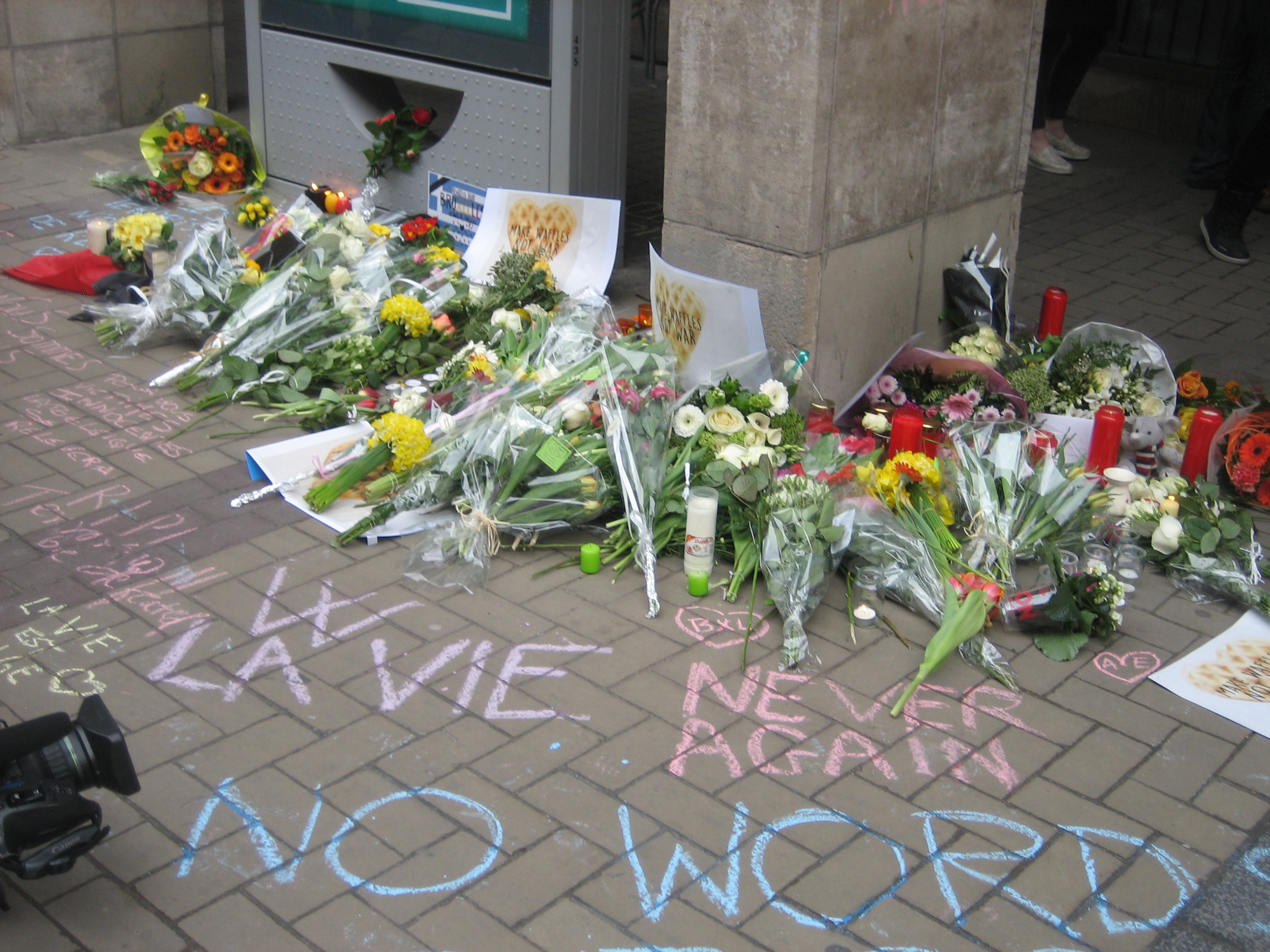
Entrance of Maalbeek metro station, two days after Brussels bombings

- 5 March – The party of Slovak prime minister Robert Fico wins the election but loses the parliamentary majority.
- 13 March – At least 34 people are killed and 125 wounded in a suicide car bombing in the Turkish capital of Ankara.
- 18 March – Paris attacks suspect Salah Abdeslam is shot and arrested in a police raid in the Molenbeek area of Brussels after a four-month international manhunt.
- 19 March – Flydubai Flight 981 crashes while attempting to land at Rostov-on-Don Airport, Russia, killing all 62 people on board.
- 20 March – At least 14 people are killed after a coach carrying Erasmus exchange students crashes near Barcelona.
- 22 March – 32 people are killed and 316 injured in attacks at Brussels Airport and Maalbeek metro station.
- 24 March – Ex-Bosnian Serb leader Radovan Karadžić is sentenced to 40 years in prison after being found guilty of genocide and crimes against humanity committed during the Bosnian War.

=== April ===
- 3 April – A ceasefire is announced after at least 193 soldiers are killed in clashes between Azerbaijani and Armenian forces over the disputed Nagorno-Karabakh region.
- 4 April – Thousands of people protest in Reykjavík, asking for the resignation of Prime Minister Sigmundur Davíð Gunnlaugsson, after Panama Papers investigation revealed that he had hidden investments in tax havens.
- 18 April – More than 400 migrants and refugees drown in the Mediterranean Sea while trying to cross by boat from Egypt to Italy.
- 21 April – The Bulgarian parliament approves the introduction of compulsory voting.
- 29 April – A helicopter ferrying passengers from a Norwegian oil platform crashes in the North Sea, killing all 13 people on board.

=== May ===
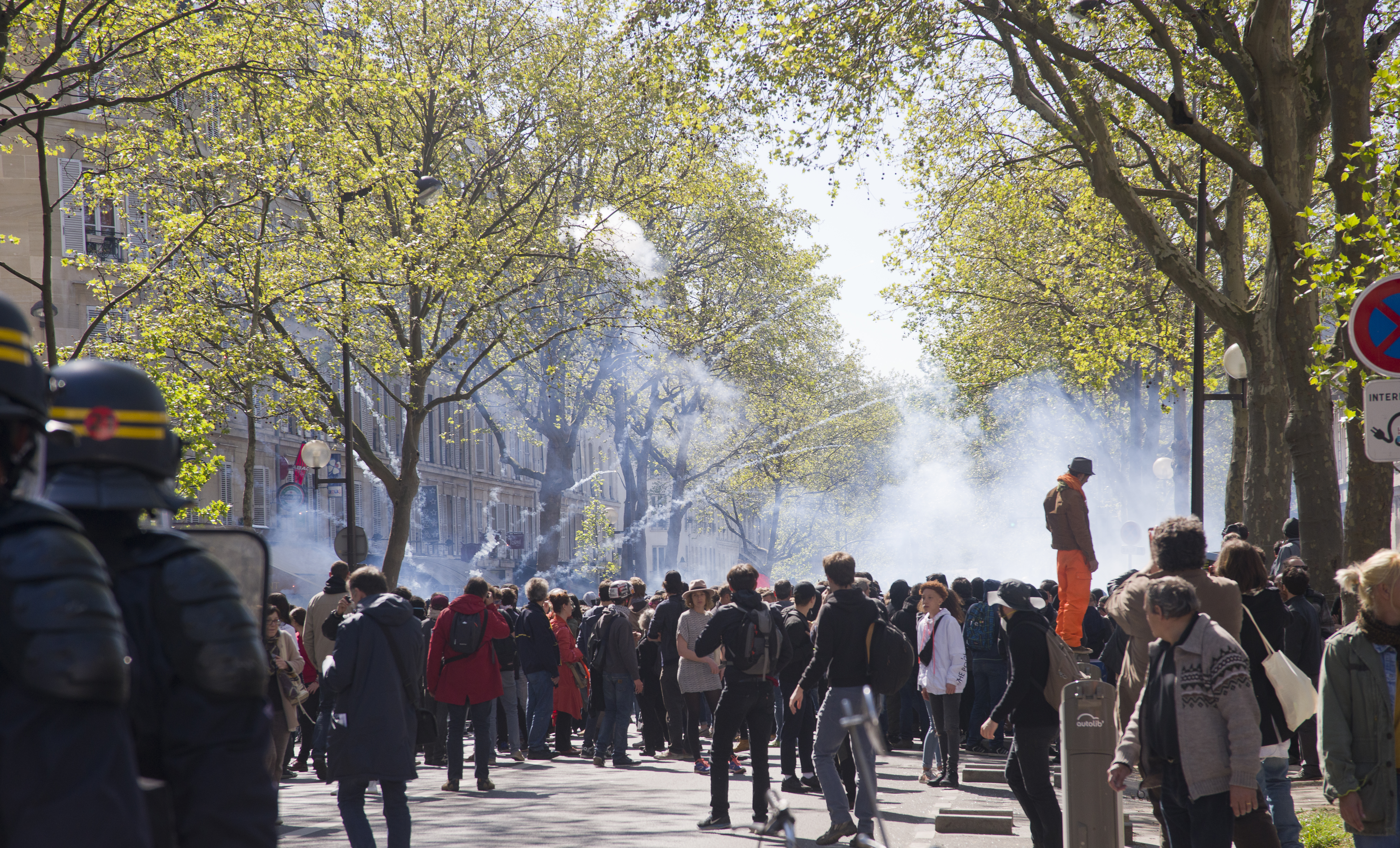
Violence during Paris anti-labor reform protests, 1 May

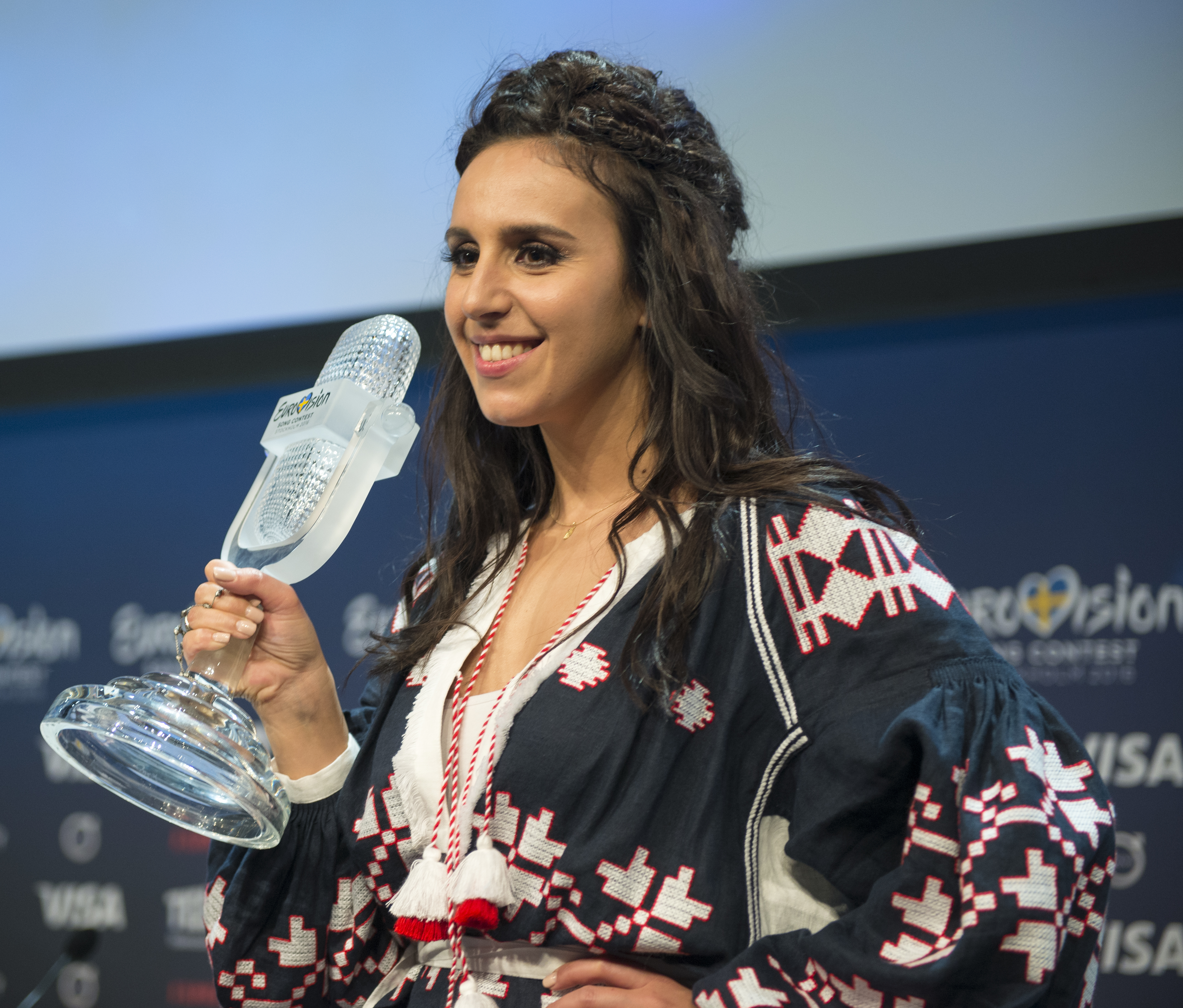
Jamala, winner of the Eurovision Song Contest 2016

- 11 May – Italy becomes the last Western European country to legalize same-sex civil unions.
- 14 May – Jamala, representing Ukraine with the song "1944", wins the Eurovision Song Contest 2016 in Stockholm, Sweden.
- 19 May – EgyptAir Flight 804 crashes off the Greek island of Karpathos, killing all 66 people on board.
- 22 May
  - A gunman fires shots into a small crowd attending an open air concert in Nenzing, Austria, killing two people and wounding 11 others before shooting himself to death.
  - Independent Green Alexander Van der Bellen is narrowly elected President of Austria.
- 29 May – 17 people die in a fire at a building housing elderly people in a village near Ukraine's capital Kyiv.

=== June ===
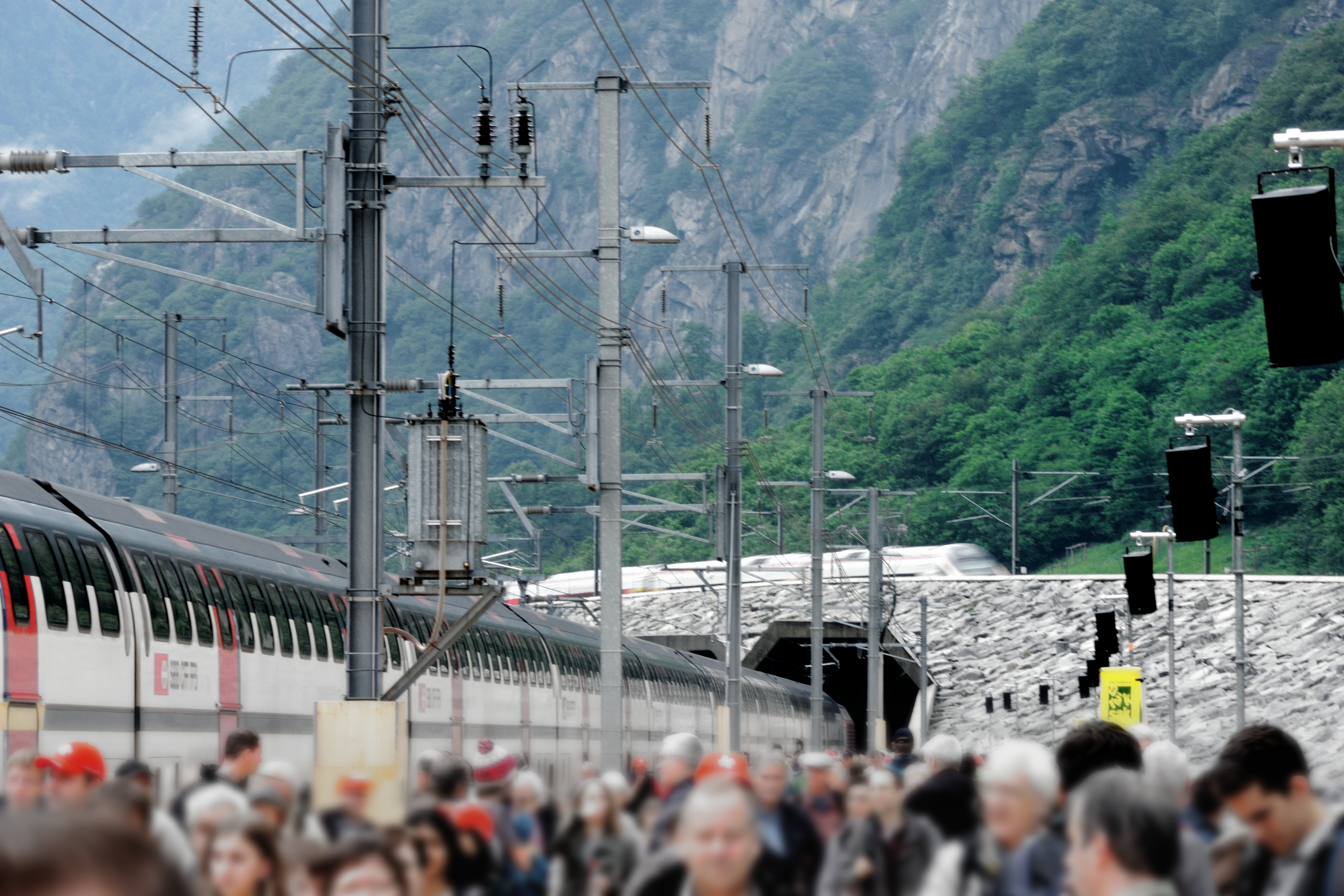
Inauguration of the Gotthard Base Tunnel

Of the 382 voting areas in the United Kingdom and Gibraltar a total of 270 returned majority votes in favour of "Leave" whereas 129 returned majority votes in favour of "Remain" in the referendum including all 32 areas in Scotland. Leave Remain

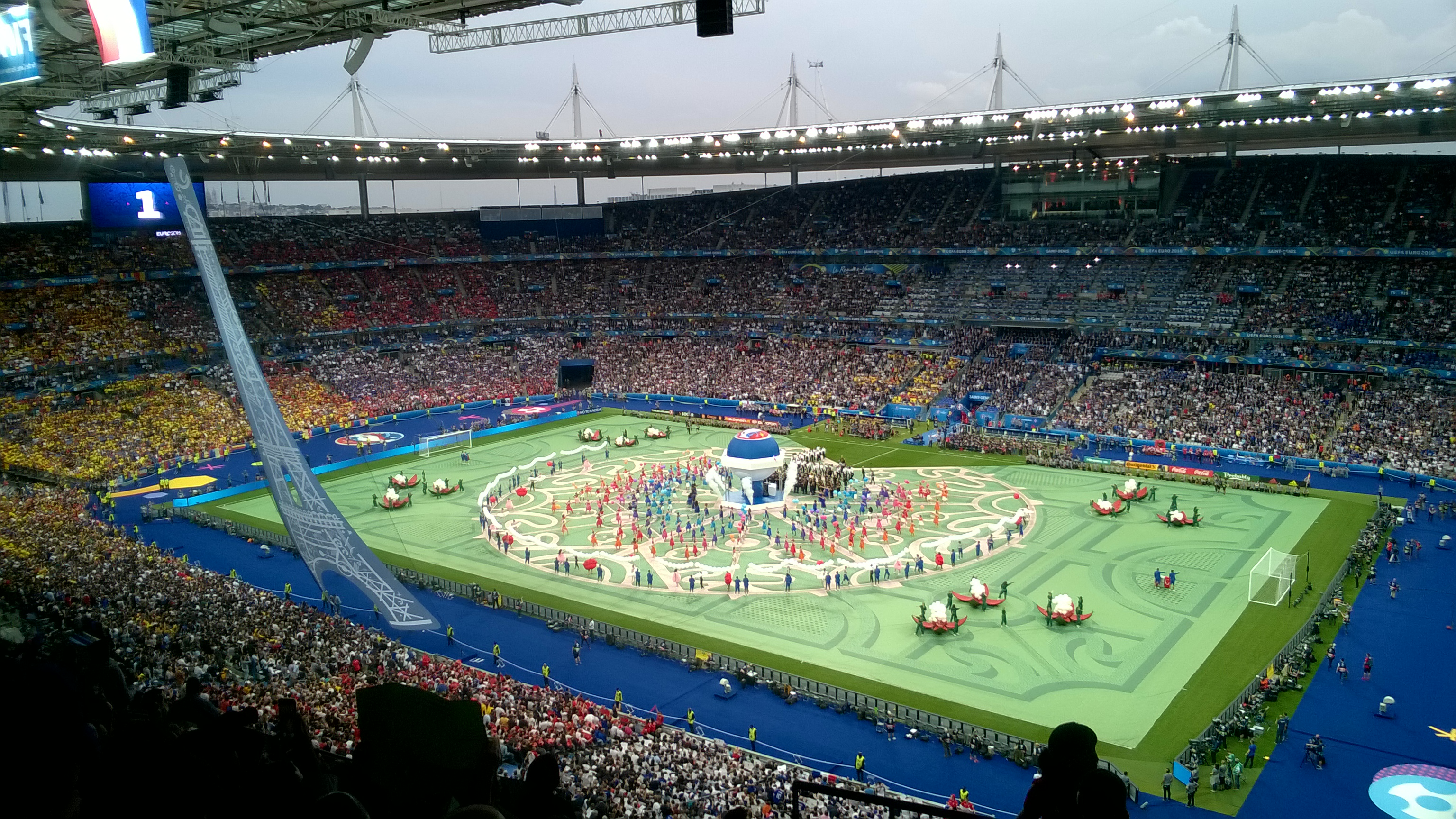
UEFA Euro 2016 opening ceremony

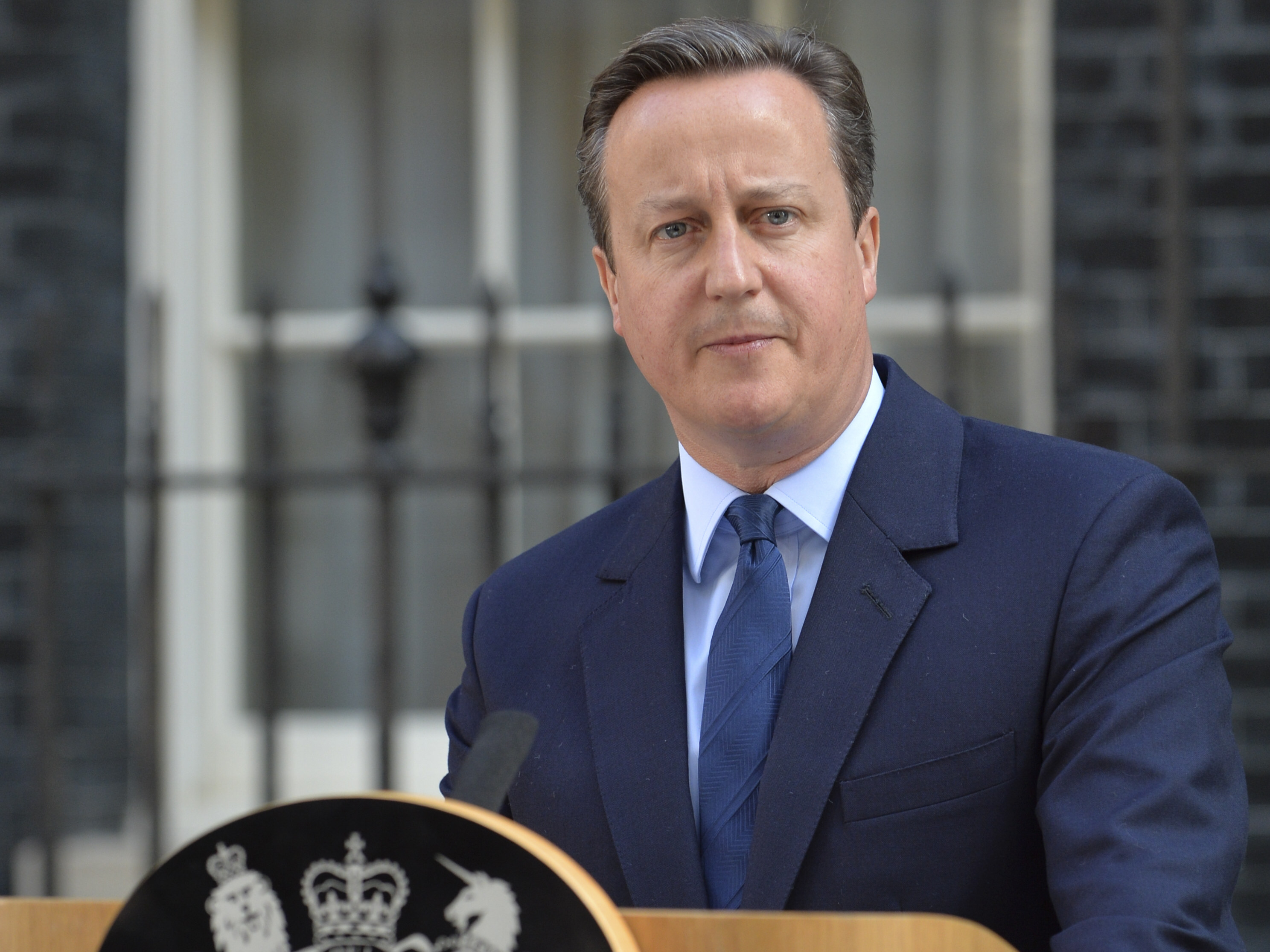
David Cameron announces his resignation as Prime Minister in the wake of the UK vote on EU membership.

- 1 June – Gotthard Base Tunnel, the world's longest and deepest traffic tunnel, opens in Switzerland. It is the first flat route through the Alps.
- 3 June – Heavy rains cause severe flooding in parts of France as well as Belgium and Germany, with reports of at least 11 people dead.
- 6 June
  - Three people are killed and 36 injured in a train crash in eastern Belgium.
  - A bus carrying school children, teachers and parents plunges into an irrigation canal in southern Turkey, killing 14 people.
- 7 June – A car bomb attack targeting a police bus kills 11 people and injures 36 in central Istanbul.
- 14 June
  - UEFA fines the Russian Football Union €150,000 and imposes a suspended disqualification on their team for violence at UEFA Euro 2016.
  - At least 40 people are injured in violence during street protests in Paris against French labor reform.
- 19 June - Baku hosts the European Grand Prix which is won by Mercedes driver Nico Rosberg
- 23 June – The United Kingdom votes to leave the European Union.
- 25 June – Guðni Jóhannesson wins Iceland's presidential election.
- 26 June – Conservative People's Party, led by Mariano Rajoy, gains the most seats in the Spanish repeat election but remains short of a majority.
- 28 June – An armed attack at Istanbul Atatürk Airport leaves at least 41 people dead and 239 others injured.

=== July ===
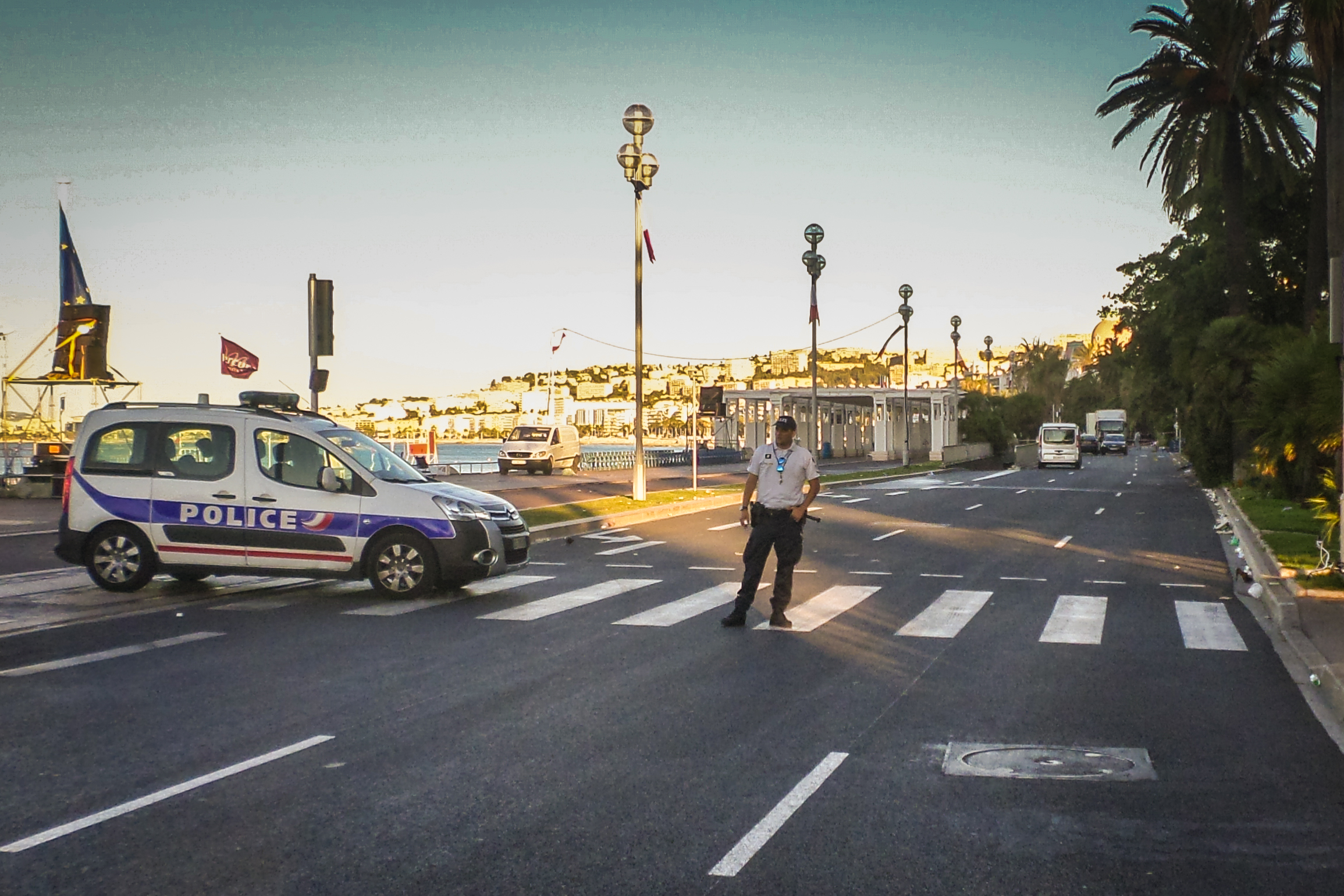
The scene of Nice attack on 15 July

- 1 July – Latvia becomes the 35th member of the OECD.
- 2 July – A gunman shoots five people dead and wounds 22 more after opening fire in a café in Žitište, Serbia.
- 8–9 July – Leaders of NATO member states meet at the two-day summit in the Polish capital of Warsaw.
- 12 July – 27 people are killed and dozens more injured in a head-on collision involving two passenger trains in the Apulia region of Italy.
- 13 July – Theresa May replaces David Cameron as leader of the Conservative Party and becomes Prime Minister of the United Kingdom.
- 14 July – At least 86 people are killed after a truck is deliberately driven into a Bastille Day crowd in Nice, France.
- 15–16 July – At least 265 people are killed and more than 3,000 members of Turkey's armed forces arrested after an attempted military coup.
- 21 July – Rioting erupts in the Armenian capital of Yerevan as protesters clash with police over the government's handling of a four-day hostage crisis.
- 22 July – A gunman opens fire near a shopping mall in Munich, Germany, killing 9 people and injuring 27.

=== August ===
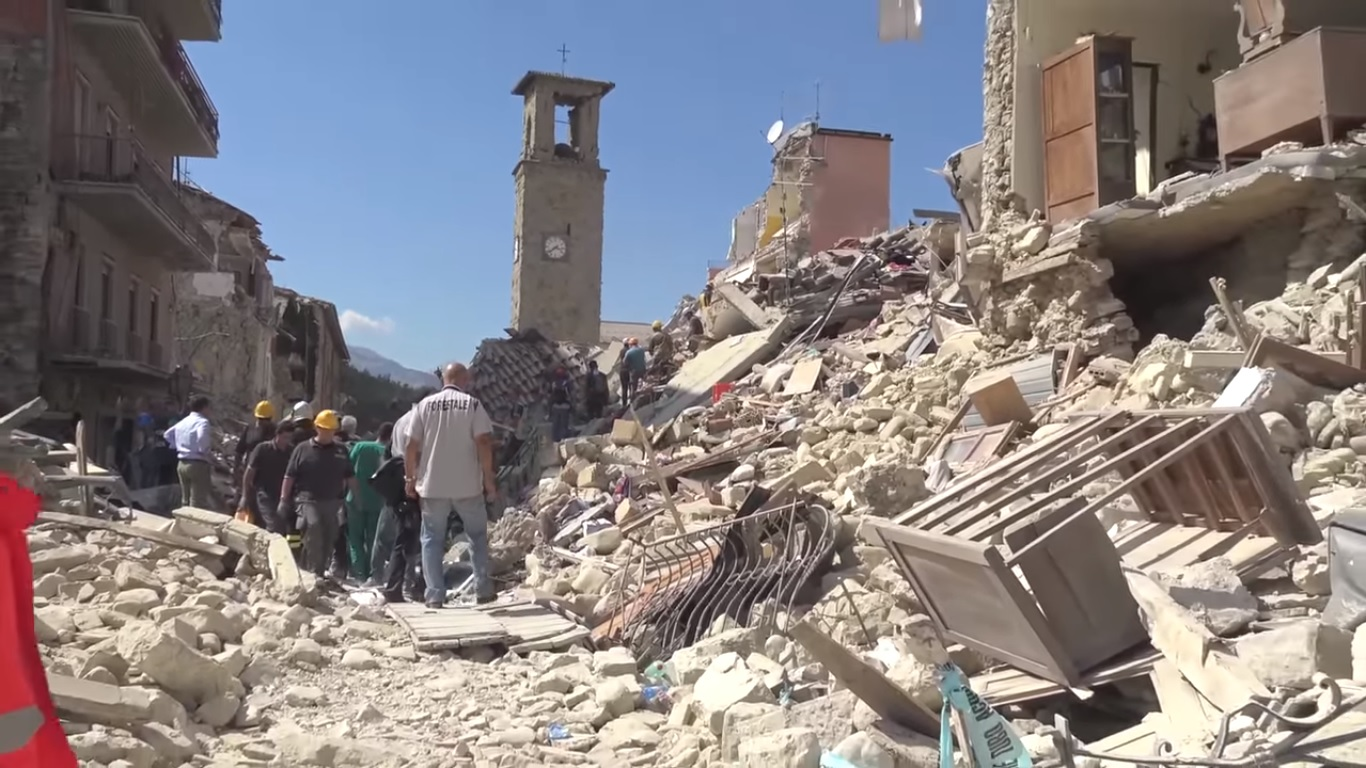
Amatrice destroyed by 24 August earthquake

- 6 August – An accidental explosion and fire kill at least 13 people in a bar in the French city of Rouen.
- 7 August – At least 21 people are dead and six are missing after torrential rains and flooding affect Macedonia's capital of Skopje.
- 10 August
  - Three people are killed and hundreds left critically injured as major wildfires sweep across the Portuguese island of Madeira.
  - A wave of Kurdish rebel attacks targeting police and soldiers in southeast Turkey kill at least 12 people.
- 20 August – At least 51 people are killed and scores more wounded in a suicide attack at a wedding ceremony in Turkey's southeastern province of Gaziantep.
- 24 August – A magnitude 6.2 earthquake hits central Italy, killing at least 290 people.
- 26 August
  - Yavuz Sultan Selim Bridge, the world's tallest suspension bridge, opens to traffic across the Bosphorus.
  - Kurdish militants attack a police checkpoint in southeast Turkey with an explosives-laden truck, killing at least 11 police officers and wounding 78 other people.
- 27 August – At least 17 migrant workers die after a fire breaks out at a Moscow warehouse.

=== September ===
- 18 September – Russia's parliamentary elections bring a landslide win for President Vladimir Putin's United Russia and its allies.
- 30 September – a legal ban on full face-covering veils was adopted by the Bulgarian parliament.

=== October ===
- 2 October – 2016 Hungarian migrant quota referendum: 3,362,224 or 98.36% of valid votes reject EU's mandatory migrant quotas.
- 9 October – A car bomb attack outside the Durak gendarmerie station in southeastern Turkey leaves 10 soldiers and eight civilians dead and scores of others injured.
- 10 October – Kersti Kaljulaid becomes the first female President of Estonia.
- 26 October – Powerful earthquakes rock central Italy, causing buildings to crumble, knocking power out and sending panicked residents fleeing into the streets.

=== November ===
- 9 November – A derailment on the Tramlink in Croydon, London, kills seven people and injures more than 50 others.
- 13 November – Pro-Russian candidate Igor Dodon wins the second round of Moldova's presidential election.
- 14 November – Bulgarian Prime Minister Boyko Borisov submits his resignation to the National Assembly after opposition-backed Rumen Radev wins the presidential runoff.
- 16 November – Russian President Vladimir Putin issues a decree for Russia to withdraw from the Rome Statute of the International Criminal Court.

=== December ===
- 4 December – Alexander Van der Bellen wins the Austrian presidential election in a re-run of the second round.
- 5 December – Italian Prime Minister Matteo Renzi resigns after Italy votes no in a referendum on constitutional reform.
- 9 December – The European Union grants visa-free travel for Georgia and Ukraine.
- 10 December – A cargo train carrying propane-butane derails and explodes in a northeastern Bulgarian village, killing five people and injuring at least 27.
- 17 December – A suspected suicide car bomb in central Turkey kills 13 soldiers aboard a bus and wounds 55 more.
- 19 December
  - The Russian ambassador to Turkey, Andrei Karlov, is assassinated in Ankara.
  - At least 13 people are killed and more than 40 others are injured as a truck rams into a packed Christmas market in Berlin.
  - At least 75 people die from poisoning after consuming a bath lotion containing alcohol in the Siberian city of Irkutsk.
- 23 December – An Afriqiyah Airways flight originating from Sabha, Libya, is hijacked and forced to make an emergency landing in Malta.

== Sports ==
- 2016 European Grand Prix
- Euro 2016

== Deaths ==
=== January ===
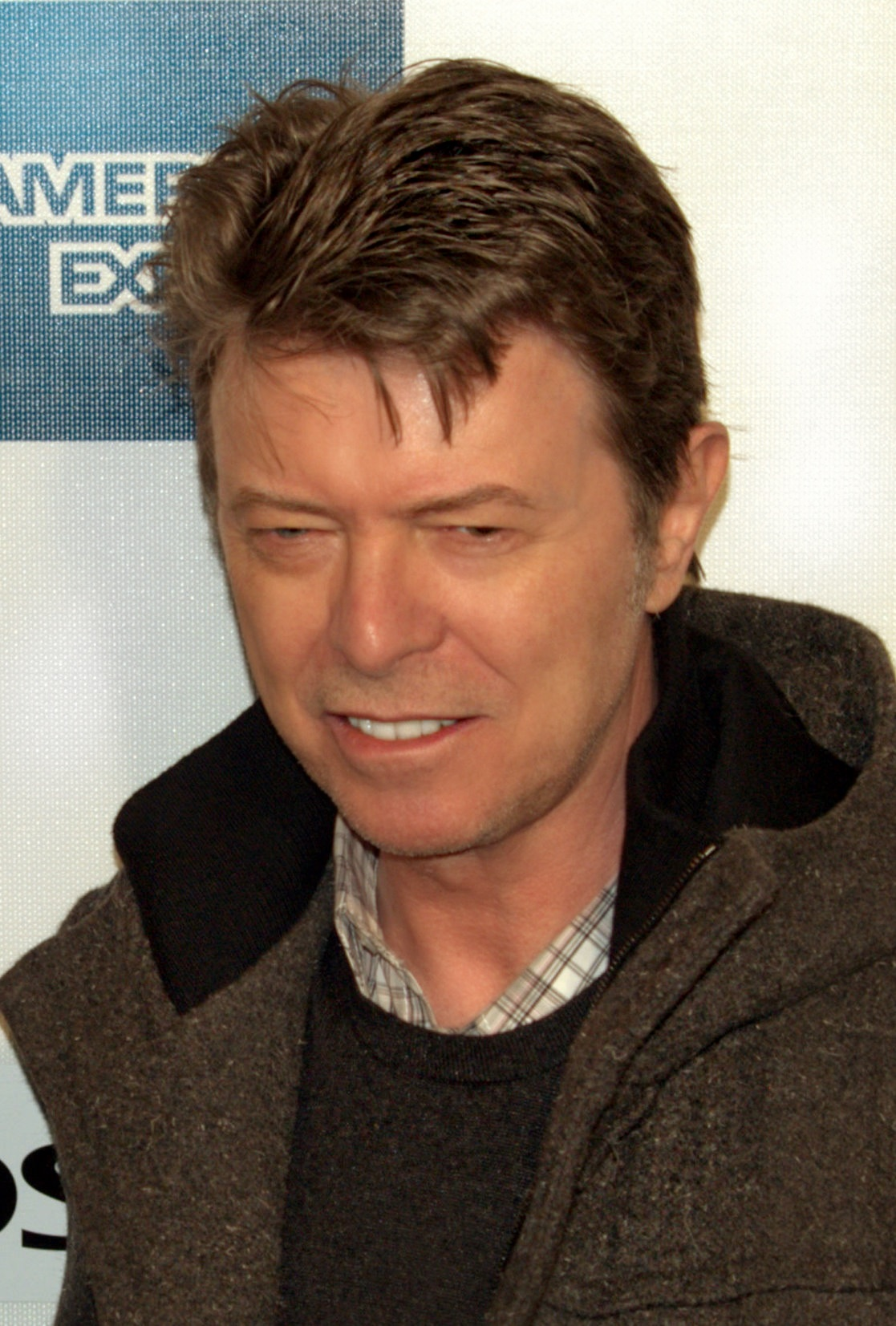
David Bowie

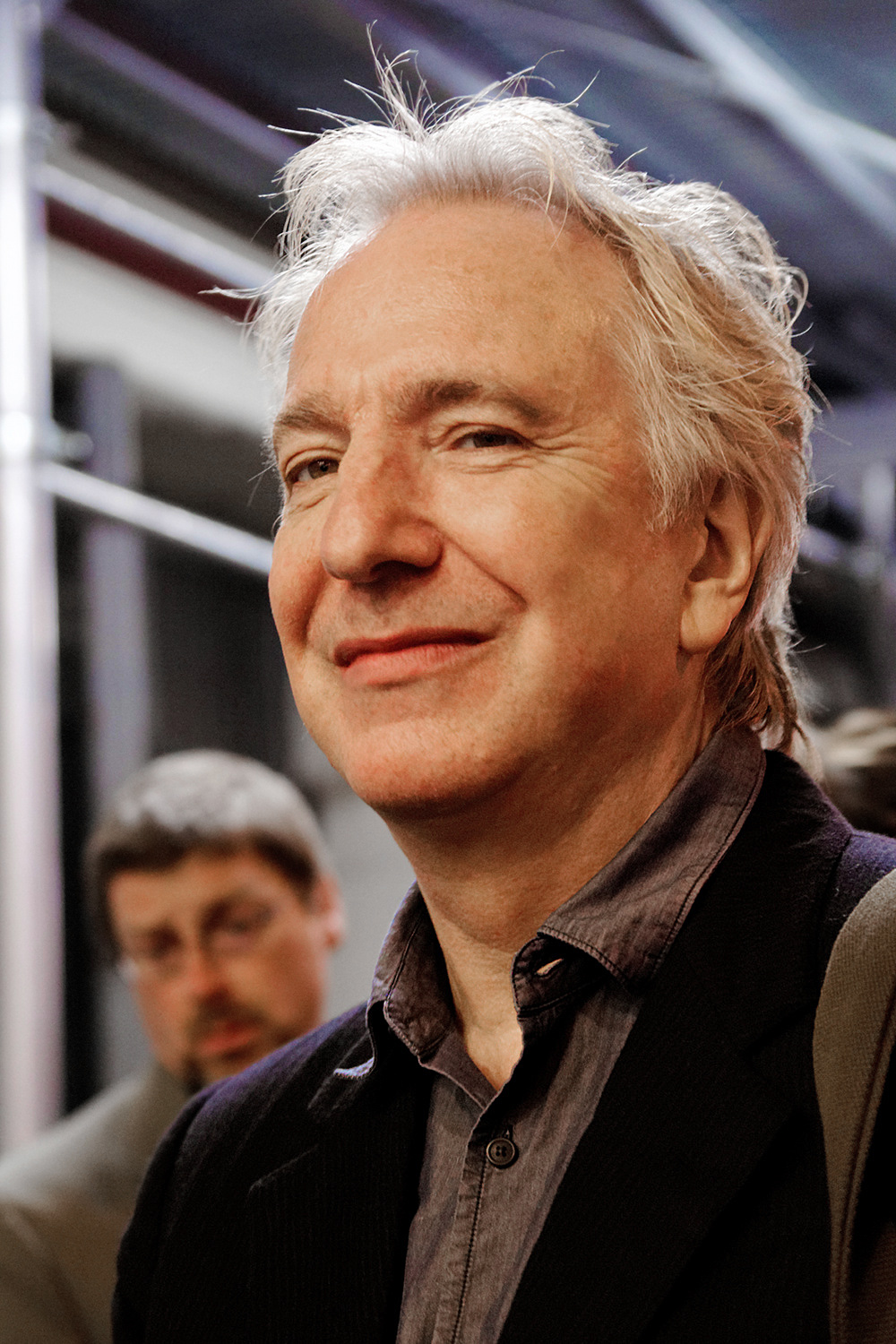
Alan Rickman

- 1 January – Vilmos Zsigmond, Hungarian-American cinematographer (b. 1930)
- 2 January – Michel Delpech, French singer-songwriter and actor (b. 1946)
- 3 January – Peter Naur, Danish computer scientist (b. 1928)
- 4 January – Michel Galabru, French actor (b. 1922)
- 5 January – Pierre Boulez, French composer, conductor, writer and pianist (b. 1925)
- 6 January – Silvana Pampanini, Italian actress and director (b. 1925)
- 7 January – André Courrèges, French fashion designer (b. 1923)
- 8 January – Maria Teresa de Filippis, Italian racing driver (b. 1926)
- 10 January – David Bowie, English singer, songwriter and producer (b. 1947)
- 14 January – Alan Rickman, English actor and director (b. 1946)
- 18 January – Michel Tournier, French writer (b. 1924)
- 19 January – Ettore Scola, Italian screenwriter and film director (b. 1931)
- 26 January – Black, English singer-songwriter (b. 1962)
- 29 January – Jacques Rivette, French film director and film critic (b. 1928)
- 30 January – Frank Finlay, English stage, film and television actor (b. 1926)
- 31 January – Terry Wogan, Irish-British radio and television broadcaster (b. 1938)

=== February ===
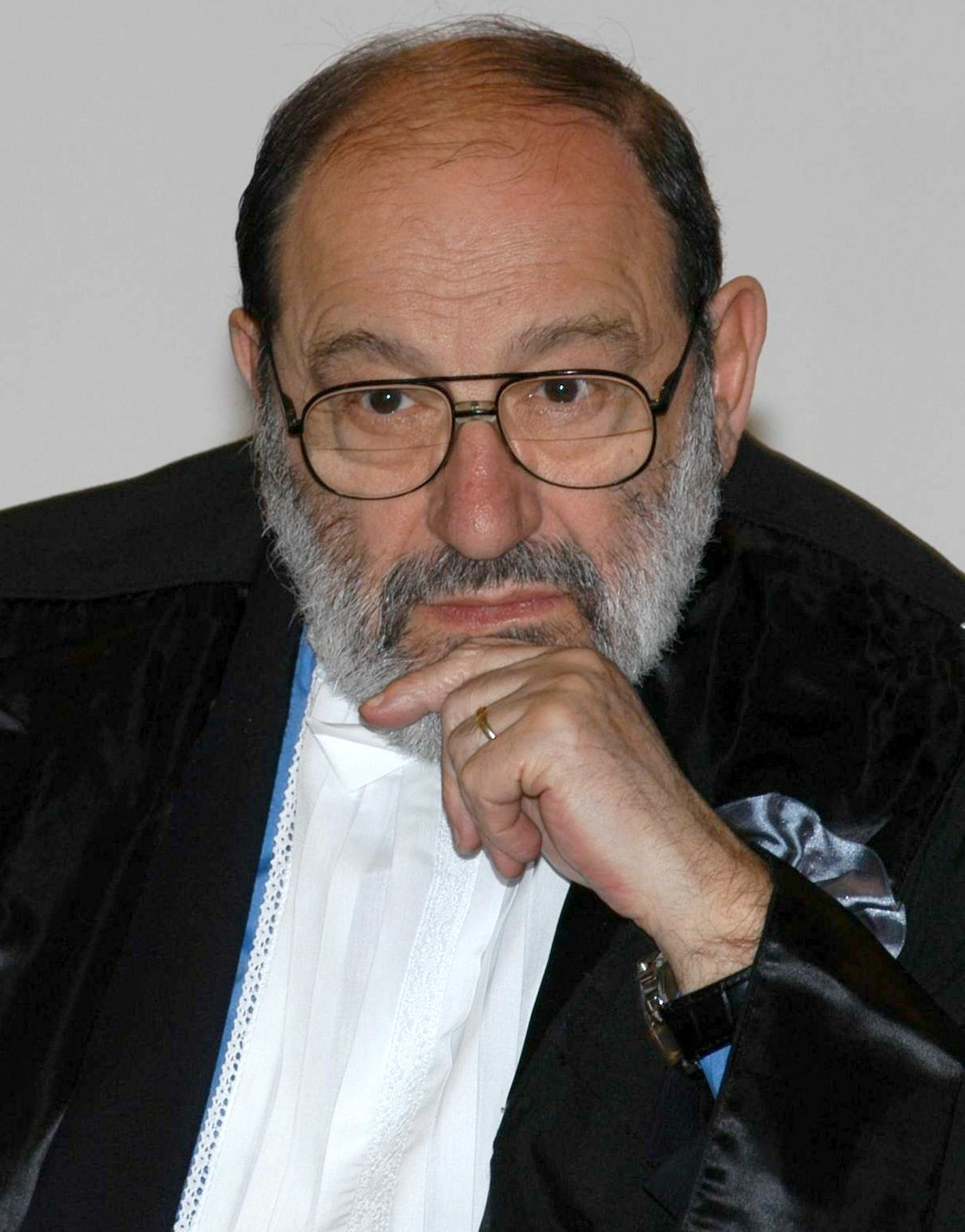
Umberto Eco

- 13 February
  - Trifon Ivanov, Bulgarian footballer (b. 1965)
  - Slobodan Santrač, Serbian football manager and player (b. 1946)
- 15 February – George Gaynes, Finnish-born American actor (b. 1917)
- 17 February – Andrzej Żuławski, Polish film director and writer (b. 1940)
- 19 February – Umberto Eco, Italian novelist, essayist, literary critic, philosopher and semiotician (b. 1932)
- 22 February – Douglas Slocombe, English cinematographer (b. 1913)
- 29 February
  - Hannes Löhr, German football player and manager (b. 1942)
  - José Parra Martínez, Spanish football defender (b. 1925)

=== March ===
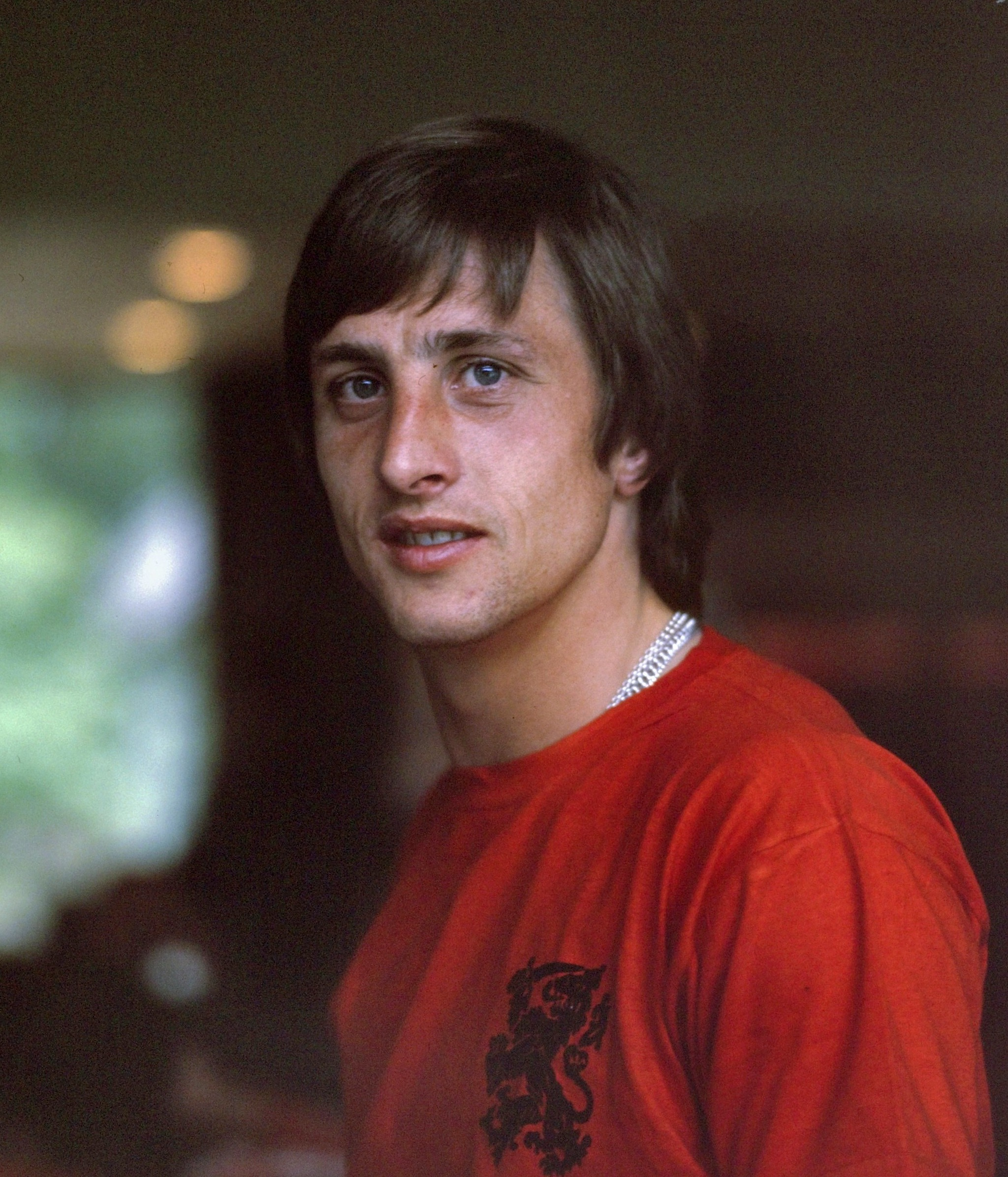
Johan Cruyff

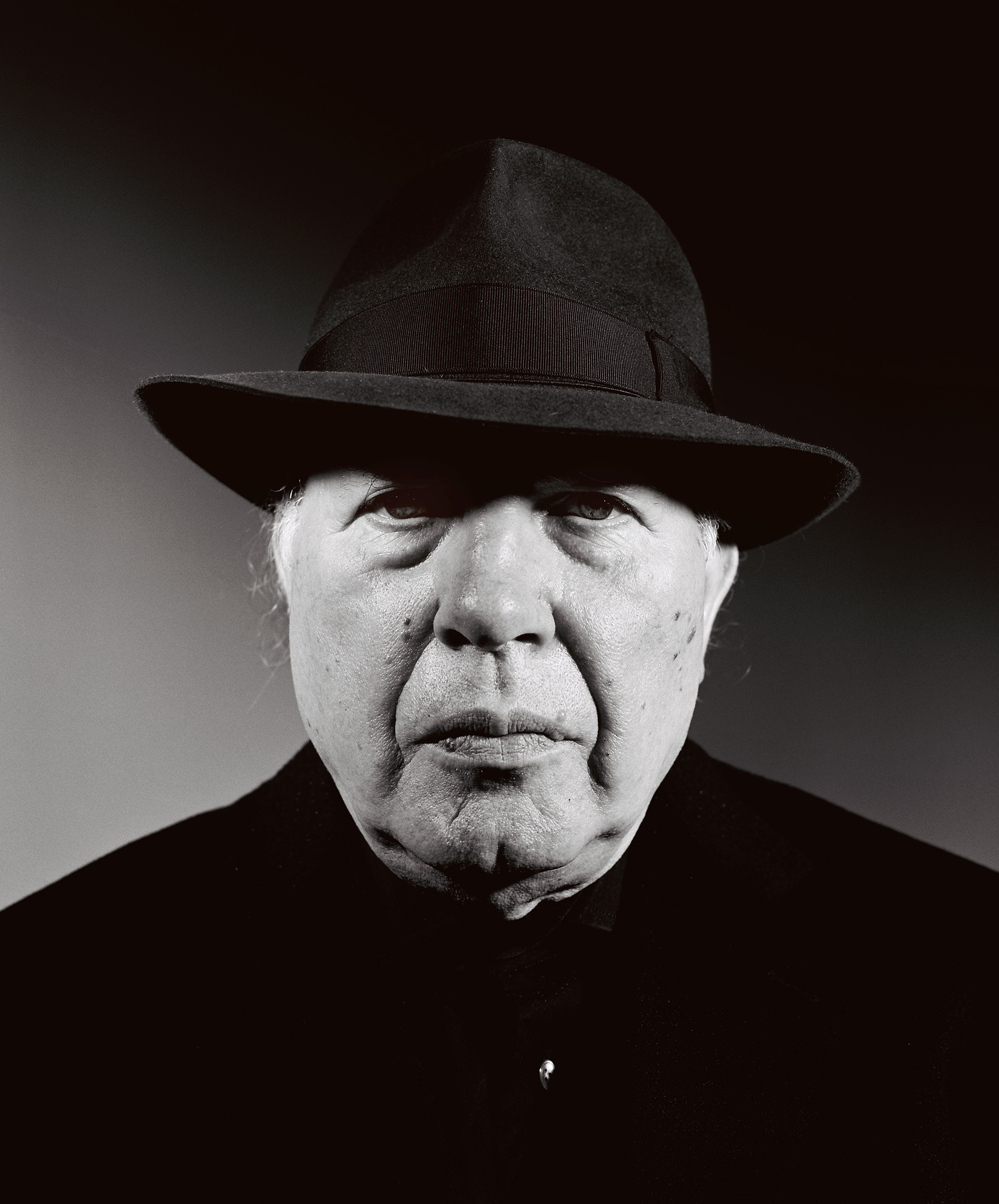
Imre Kertész

- 5 March – Nikolaus Harnoncourt, Austrian conductor (b. 1929)
- 8 March – George Martin, English record producer, arranger, composer, conductor, audio engineer and musician (b. 1926)
- 10 March – Keith Emerson, English keyboardist and composer (b. 1944)
- 11 March
  - Iolanda Balaș, Romanian Olympic high jumper (b. 1936)
  - Dragan Nikolić, Serbian actor (b. 1943)
- 14 March – Peter Maxwell Davies, English composer and conductor (b. 1934)
- 18 March
  - Lothar Späth, German politician (b. 1937)
  - Guido Westerwelle, Foreign Minister and Vice Chancellor of Germany (b. 1961)
- 20 March – Anker Jørgensen, Prime Minister and Foreign Minister of Denmark (b. 1922)
- 21 March – Andrew Grove, Hungarian-born American businessman, engineer, author and science pioneer (b. 1936)
- 24 March
  - Roger Cicero, German jazz and pop musician (b. 1970)
  - Johan Cruyff, Dutch professional football player and coach (b. 1947)
- 31 March
  - Georges Cottier, Swiss Cardinal of the Roman Catholic Church (b. 1922)
  - Hans-Dietrich Genscher, Vice Chancellor, Foreign Minister and Interior Minister of Germany (b. 1927)
  - Zaha Hadid, Iraqi-born British architect (b. 1950)
  - Imre Kertész, Hungarian author (b. 1929)

=== April ===
- 3 April – Cesare Maldini, Italian football manager and player (b. 1932)
- 4 April – Chus Lampreave, Spanish actress (b. 1930)
- 12 April – Arnold Wesker, English dramatist (b. 1932)
- 16 April – Louis Pilot, Luxembourgian football player and manager (b. 1940)
- 19 April – Walter Kohn, Austrian-born American theoretical physicist and theoretical chemist (b. 1923)
- 20 April – Guy Hamilton, English film director (b. 1922)
- 24 April – Klaus Siebert, German biathlete (b. 1955)
- 25 April – Martin Gray, Polish writer (b. 1922)
- 27 April – Viktor Gavrikov, Lithuanian-Swiss chess Grandmaster (b. 1957)
- 30 April – Harry Kroto, English Nobel chemist (b. 1939)

=== May ===
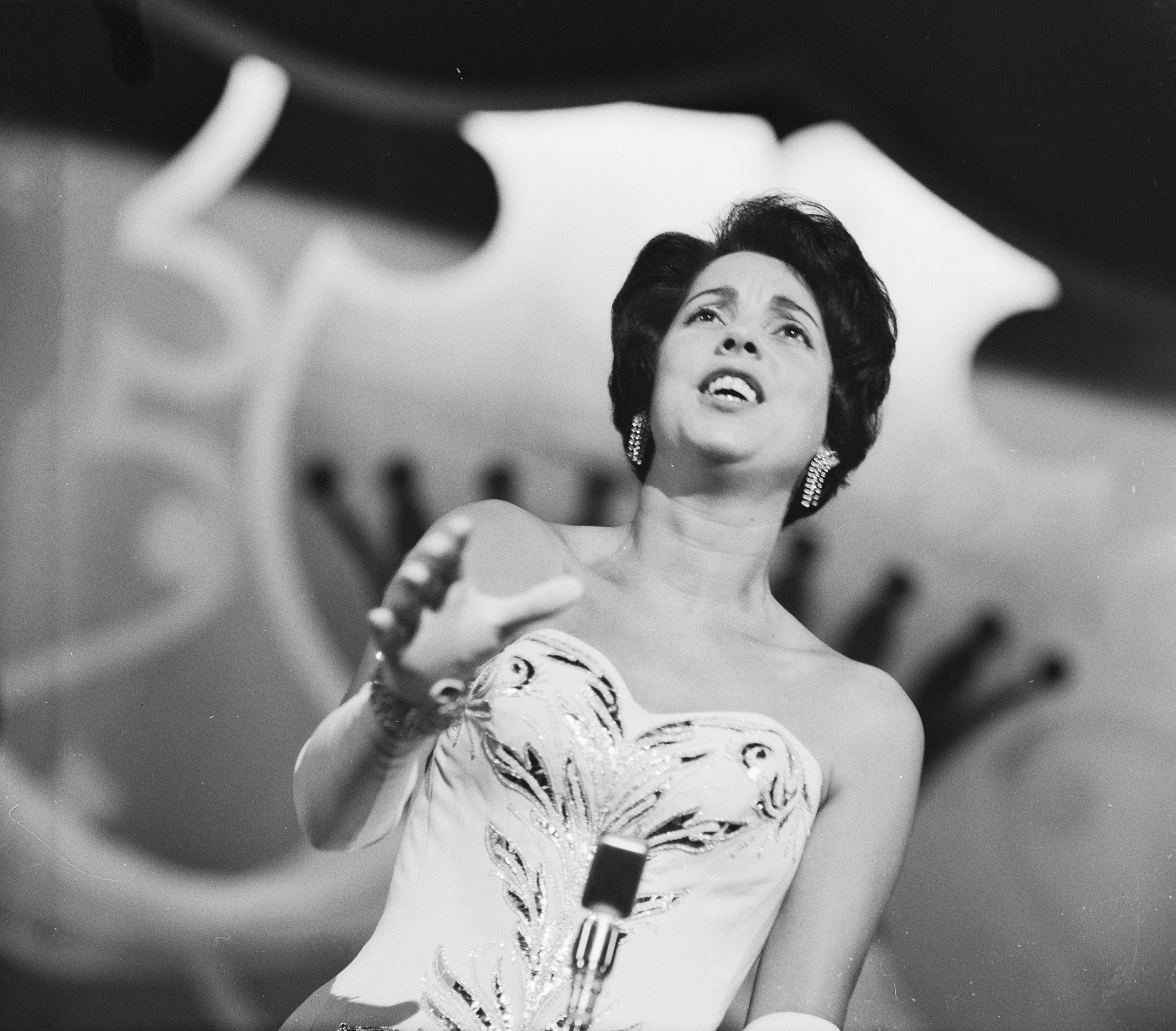
Corry Brokken

- 5 May – Siné, French political cartoonist (b. 1928)
- 6 May – Margot Honecker, East German politician (b. 1927)
- 16 May – Giovanni Coppa, Italian Cardinal of the Roman Catholic Church (b. 1925)
- 19 May
  - Alexandre Astruc, French film critic and film director (b. 1923)
  - Marco Pannella, Italian politician (b. 1930)
  - Alan Young, English-born Canadian-American actor (b. 1919)
- 21 May
  - Sándor Tarics, Hungarian Olympic water polo player (b. 1913)
  - Nick Menza, German-born American drummer (b. 1964)
- 22 May – Bata Živojinović, Serbian actor and politician (b. 1933)
- 26 May
  - Loris Francesco Capovilla, Italian Roman Catholic prelate and cardinal (b. 1915)
  - Arturo Pomar, Spanish chess grandmaster (b. 1931)
- 28 May
  - Giorgio Albertazzi, Italian actor and film director (b. 1923)
  - David Cañada, Spanish professional road racing cyclist (b. 1975)
- 31 May – Corry Brokken, Dutch singer (b. 1932)

=== June ===
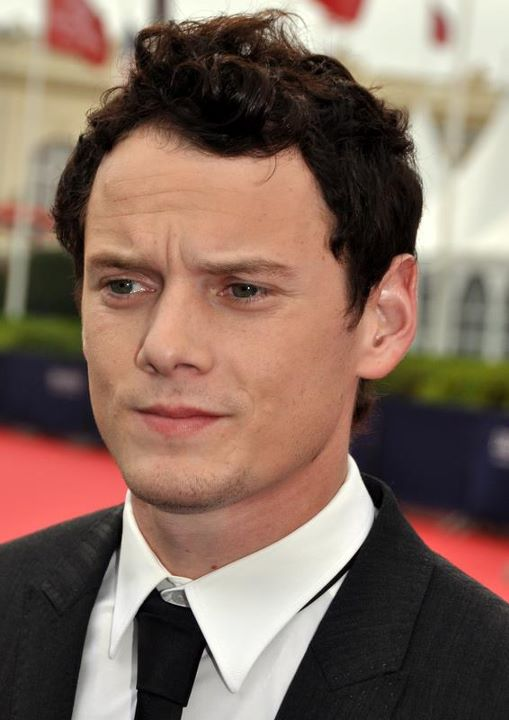
Anton Yelchin

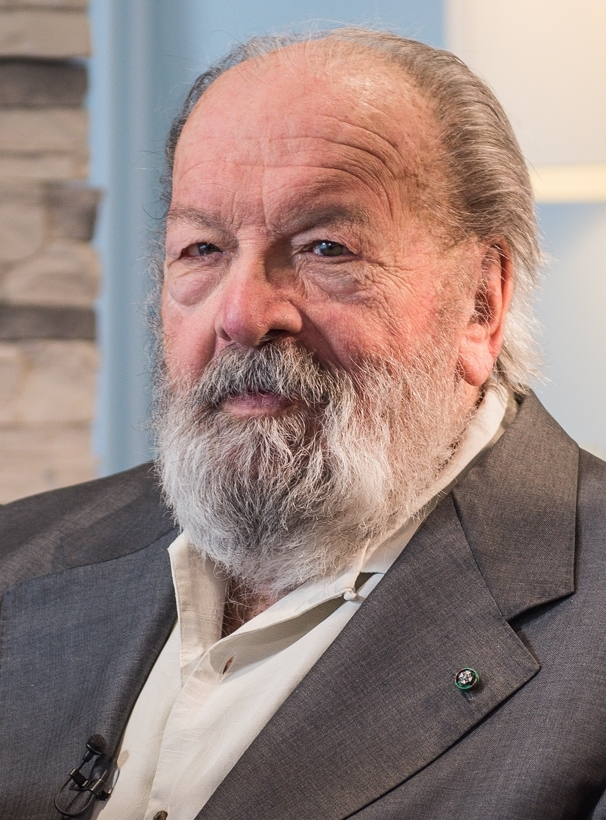
Bud Spencer

- 2 June – Tom Kibble, British theoretical physicist (b. 1932)
- 3 June – Luis Salom, Spanish motorcycle racer (b. 1991)
- 6 June
  - Peter Shaffer, English playwright and screenwriter (b. 1926)
  - Viktor Korchnoi, Russian chess grandmaster and author (b. 1931)
- 8 June – Pierre Aubert, Swiss politician and lawyer (b. 1927)
- 11 June – Rudi Altig, German professional track and road racing cyclist (b. 1937)
- 18 June – Vittorio Merloni, Italian entrepreneur and industrialist (b. 1933)
- 19 June
  - Victor Stănculescu, Romanian general (b. 1928)
  - Anton Yelchin, Russian-born American actor (b. 1989)
- 20 June – Edgard Pisani, French statesman, philosopher, and writer (b. 1918)
- 25 June – Maurice G. Dantec, French science fiction writer and musician (b. 1959)
- 27 June – Bud Spencer, Italian actor, filmmaker, and professional swimmer (b. 1929)
- 28 June – André Guelfi, French racing driver (b. 1919)

=== July ===
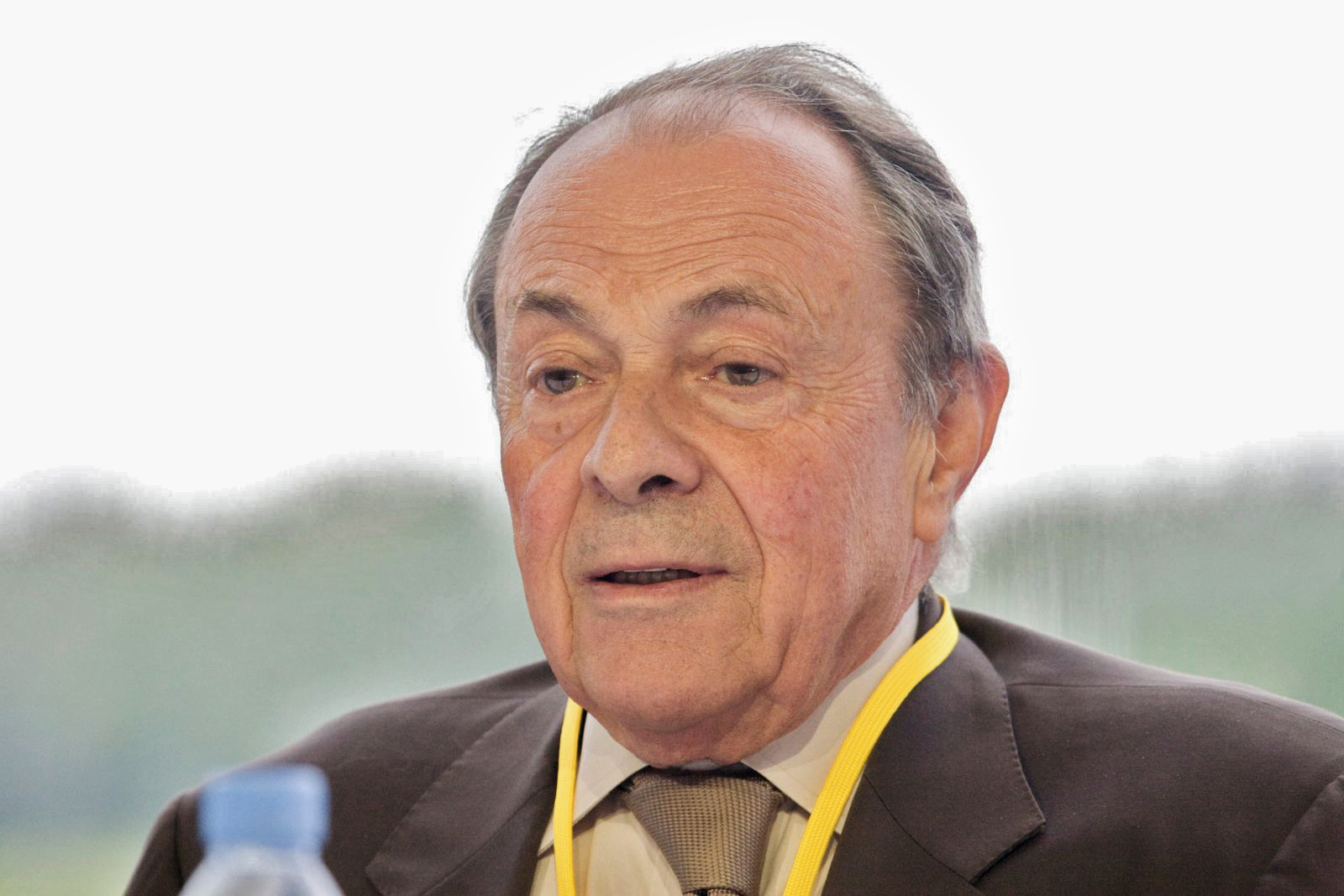
Michel Rocard

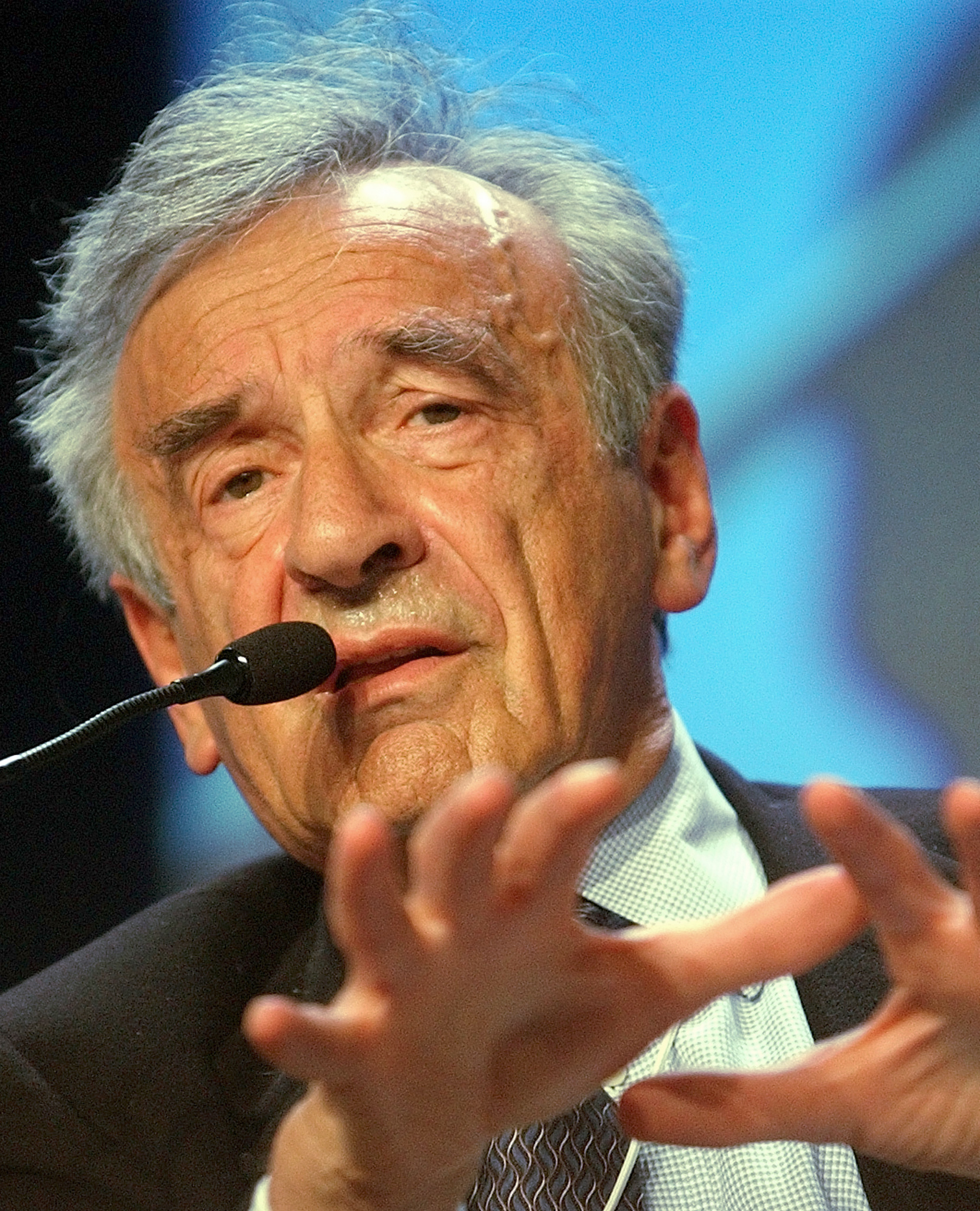
Elie Wiesel

- 1 July – Yves Bonnefoy, French poet and art historian (b. 1923)
- 2 July
  - Rudolf E. Kálmán, Hungarian-born American electrical engineer, mathematician, and inventor (b. 1930)
  - Michel Rocard, Prime Minister of France (b. 1930)
  - Elie Wiesel, Romanian-born American Jewish writer, professor, political activist, Holocaust survivor, and Nobel laureate (b. 1928)
- 6 July – Turgay Şeren, Turkish footballer (b. 1932)
- 9 July – Silvano Piovanelli, Italian prelate of the Roman Catholic Church (b. 1924)
- 12 July
  - Goran Hadžić, Serbian politician and alleged war criminal (b. 1958)
  - Zygmunt Zimowski, Polish prelate of the Roman Catholic Church (b. 1949)
- 13 July – Bernardo Provenzano, member of the Sicilian Mafia (b. 1933)
- 14 July – Péter Esterházy, Hungarian writer (b. 1950)
- 20 July – Radu Beligan, Romanian actor, director, and essayist (b. 1918)
- 23 July – Thorbjörn Fälldin, Prime Minister of Sweden (b. 1926)
- 25 July – Halil İnalcık, Turkish historian (b. 1916)
- 27 July
  - Einojuhani Rautavaara, Finnish composer (b. 1928)
  - Piet de Jong, Prime Minister of the Netherlands (b. 1915)

=== August ===
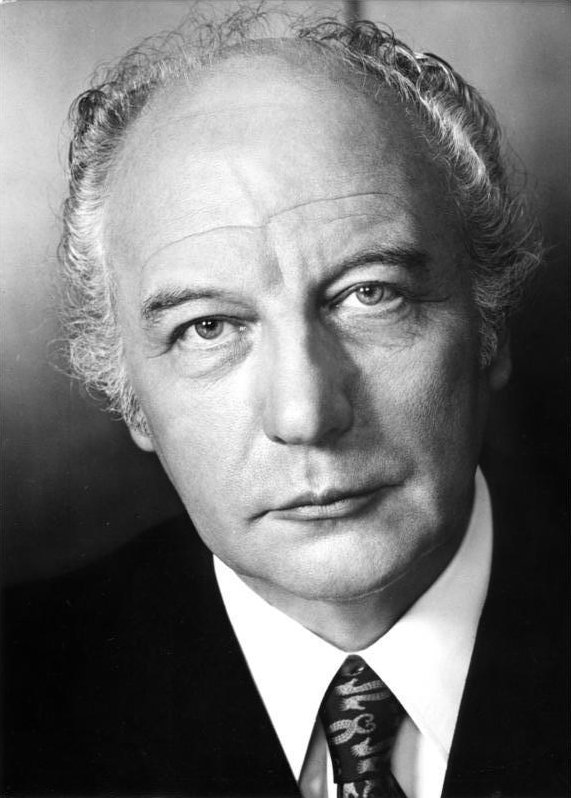
Walter Scheel

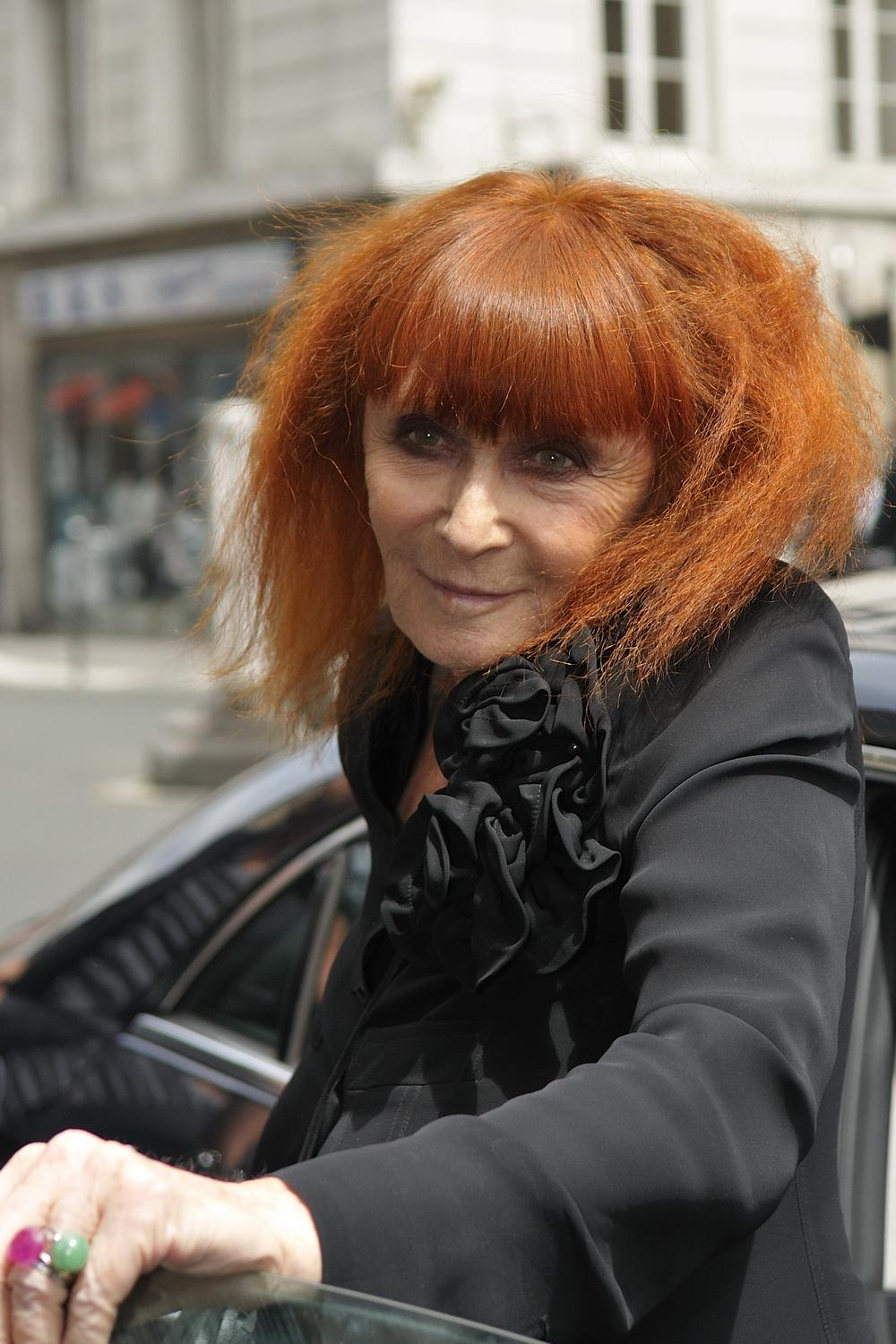
Sonia Rykiel

- 1 August – Queen Anne of Romania (b. 1923)
- 2 August – Franciszek Macharski, Polish cardinal of the Roman Catholic Church (b. 1927)
- 5 August – Alphons Egli, Swiss politician (b. 1924)
- 9 August – Gerald Grosvenor, 6th Duke of Westminster (b. 1951)
- 13 August
  - Kenny Baker, English actor and musician (b. 1934)
  - Françoise Mallet-Joris, Belgian author (b. 1930)
- 14 August – Hermann Kant, German writer (b. 1926)
- 15 August
  - Dalian Atkinson, English footballer (b. 1968)
  - Stefan Henze, German slalom canoeist (b. 1981)
- 18 August – Ernst Nolte, German historian and philosopher (b. 1923)
- 19 August – Nina Ponomaryova, Russian discus thrower (b. 1929)
- 22 August – Toots Thielemans, Belgian jazz musician (b. 1922)
- 24 August
  - Michel Butor, French writer (b. 1926)
  - Walter Scheel, President of the Federal Republic of Germany (b. 1919)
- 25 August – Sonia Rykiel, French fashion designer and writer (b. 1930)
- 26 August – Harald Grønningen, Norwegian cross country skier (b. 1934)
- 30 August
  - Věra Čáslavská, Czech artistic gymnast (b. 1942)
  - Marc Riboud, French photographer (b. 1923)

=== September ===
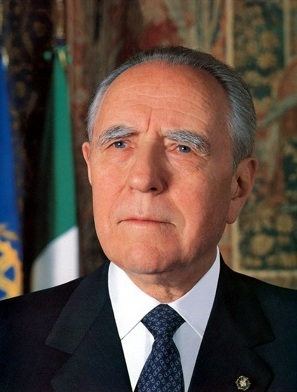
Carlo Azeglio Ciampi

- 2 September – Daniel Willems, Belgian road bicycle racer (b. 1956)
- 3 September – Jean-Christophe Yoccoz, French mathematician (b. 1957)
- 12 September – Sándor Csoóri, Hungarian poet, essayist, writer and politician (b. 1930)
- 13 September – Jonathan Riley-Smith, English medieval historian (b. 1938)
- 16 September
  - Gabriele Amorth, Italian Roman Catholic priest and an exorcist (b. 1925)
  - Carlo Azeglio Ciampi, 10th President and 49th Prime Minister of Italy (b. 1920)
- 17 September – Sigge Parling, Swedish footballer (b. 1930)
- 23 September – Marcel Artelesa, French footballer (b. 1938)

=== October ===
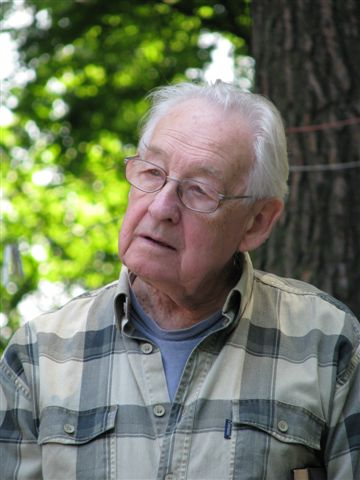
Andrzej Wajda

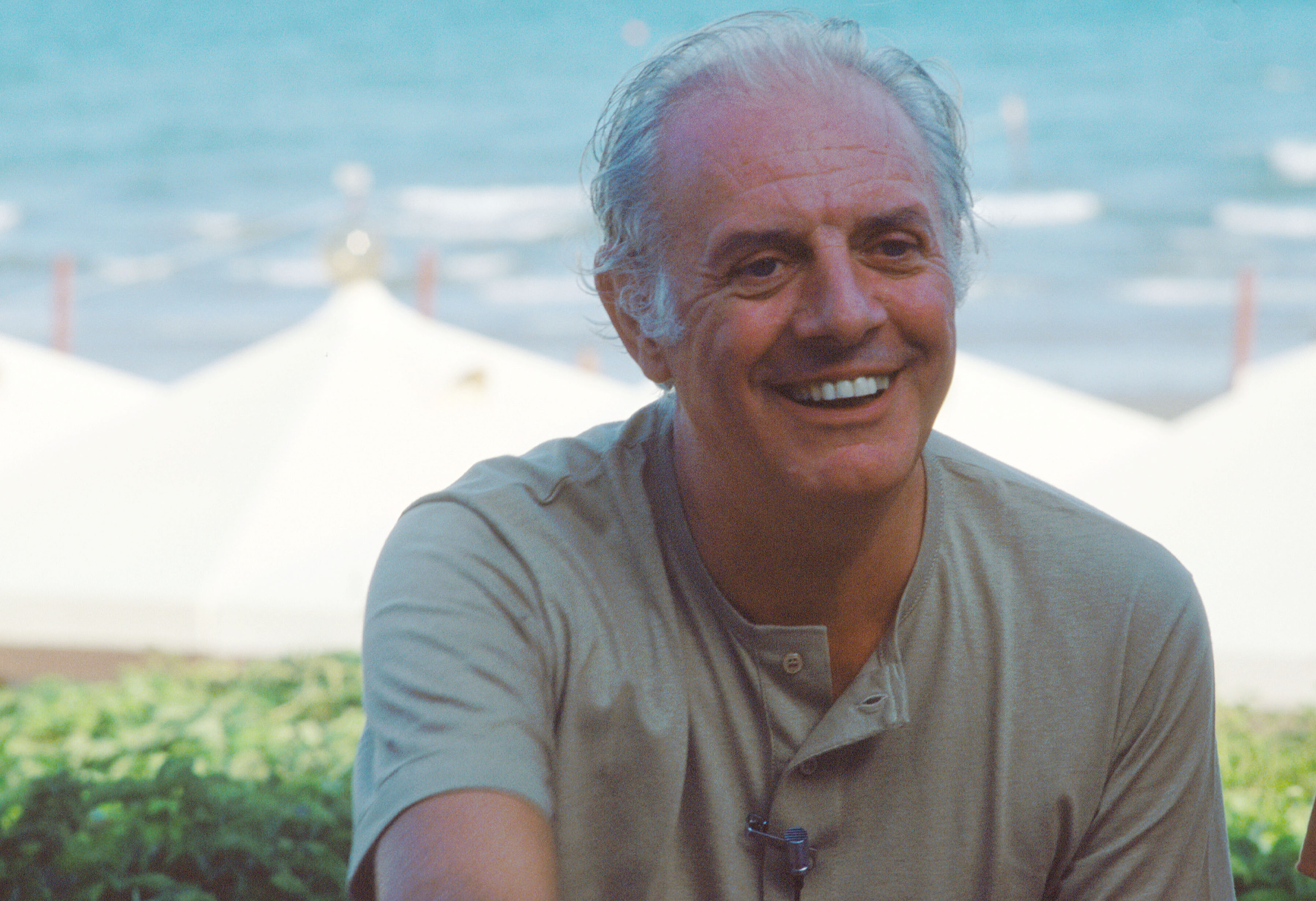
Dario Fo

- 1 October – David Herd, Scottish footballer (b. 1934)
- 2 October – Neville Marriner, English conductor (b. 1924)
- 4 October – Brigitte Hamann, German-Austrian author and historian (b. 1940)
- 5 October – Michal Kováč, 1st President of Slovakia (b. 1930)
- 8 October – Stylianos Pattakos, Greek military officer (b. 1912)
- 9 October – Andrzej Wajda, Polish film and theatre director (b. 1926)
- 13 October – Dario Fo, Italian actor, Nobel playwright and comedian (b. 1926)
- 14 October – Klim Churyumov, Ukrainian astronomer (b. 1937)
- 16 October – Viktor Zubkov, Russian basketball player (b. 1937)
- 23 October – Pete Burns, English singer-songwriter and television personality (b. 1959)
- 24 October
  - Benjamin Creme, Scottish artist, author and esotericist (b. 1922)
  - Reinhard Häfner, German footballer and coach (b. 1952)
- 29 October – Roland Dyens, French classical guitarist, composer and arranger (b. 1955)
- 31 October – Silvio Gazzaniga, Italian sculptor (b. 1921)

=== November ===
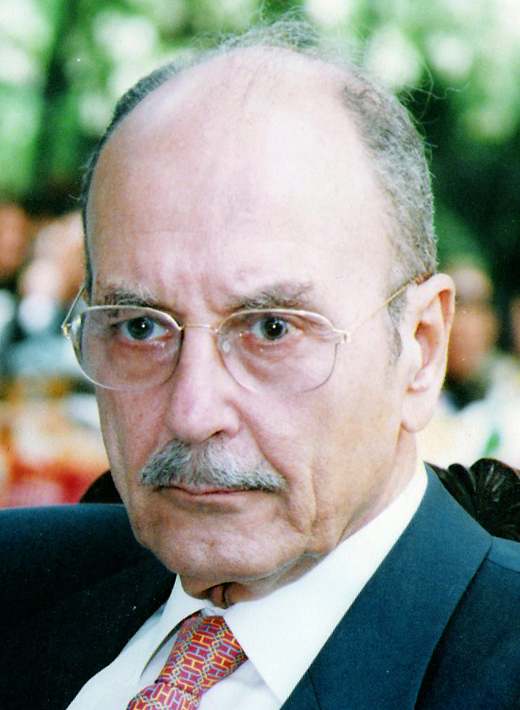
Konstantinos Stefanopoulos

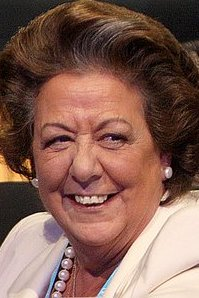
Rita Barberá

- 2 November – Oleg Popov, Russian clown and circus artist (b. 1930)
- 5 November – Marek Svatoš, Slovak professional ice hockey winger (b. 1982)
- 6 November – Zoltán Kocsis, Hungarian virtuoso pianist, conductor and composer (b. 1952)
- 9 November - La Veneno, Spanish transsexual vedette, singer and actress (b. 1964)
- 11 November
  - Ilse Aichinger, Austrian writer (b. 1921)
  - Željko Čajkovski, Croatian football player and coach (b. 1925)
- 13 November – Enzo Maiorca, Italian free diver (b. 1931)
- 16 November – Daniel Prodan, Romanian footballer (b. 1972)
- 20 November
  - Konstantinos Stephanopoulos, 5th President of Greece (b. 1926)
  - William Trevor, Irish novelist, playwright and short story writer (b. 1928)
- 23 November
  - Andrew Sachs, German-born British actor (b. 1930)
  - Rita Barberá, Spanish senator and Mayoress of Valencia (1991-2015) (b. 1948)
- 25 November – David Hamilton, English photographer and film director (b. 1933)
- 27 November – Ioannis Grivas, 176th Prime Minister of Greece (b. 1923)
- 28 November – Mark Taimanov, Russian chess Grandmaster and concert pianist (b. 1926)

=== December ===
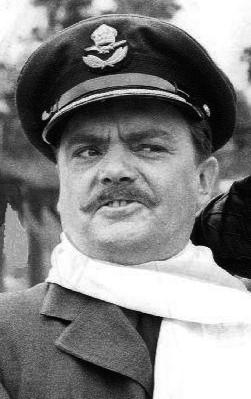
Bernard Fox

- 4 December – Gotlib, French comic artist (b. 1934)
- 5 December – Geydar Dzhemal, Russian Islamic revolutionist, philosopher, poet, political and social activist (b. 1947)
- 14 December - Bernard Fox, Welsh actor (b. 1927)

== See also ==
- 2016 in the European Union
- List of state leaders in 2016 § Europe
