= Bachelor's Day =

Bachelor's Day may refer to:

- Bachelor's Day (tradition), a tradition on leap days of allowing women to initiate dances and propose marriage
- Singles Day or Guanggun Jie (Chinese: 光棍节; pinyin: Guānggùn Jié; Wade–Giles: Kuang-kun chieh; literally "bare sticks holiday"), a day of celebration for people who are single
