= Marriage proposal =

Proposal of marriage

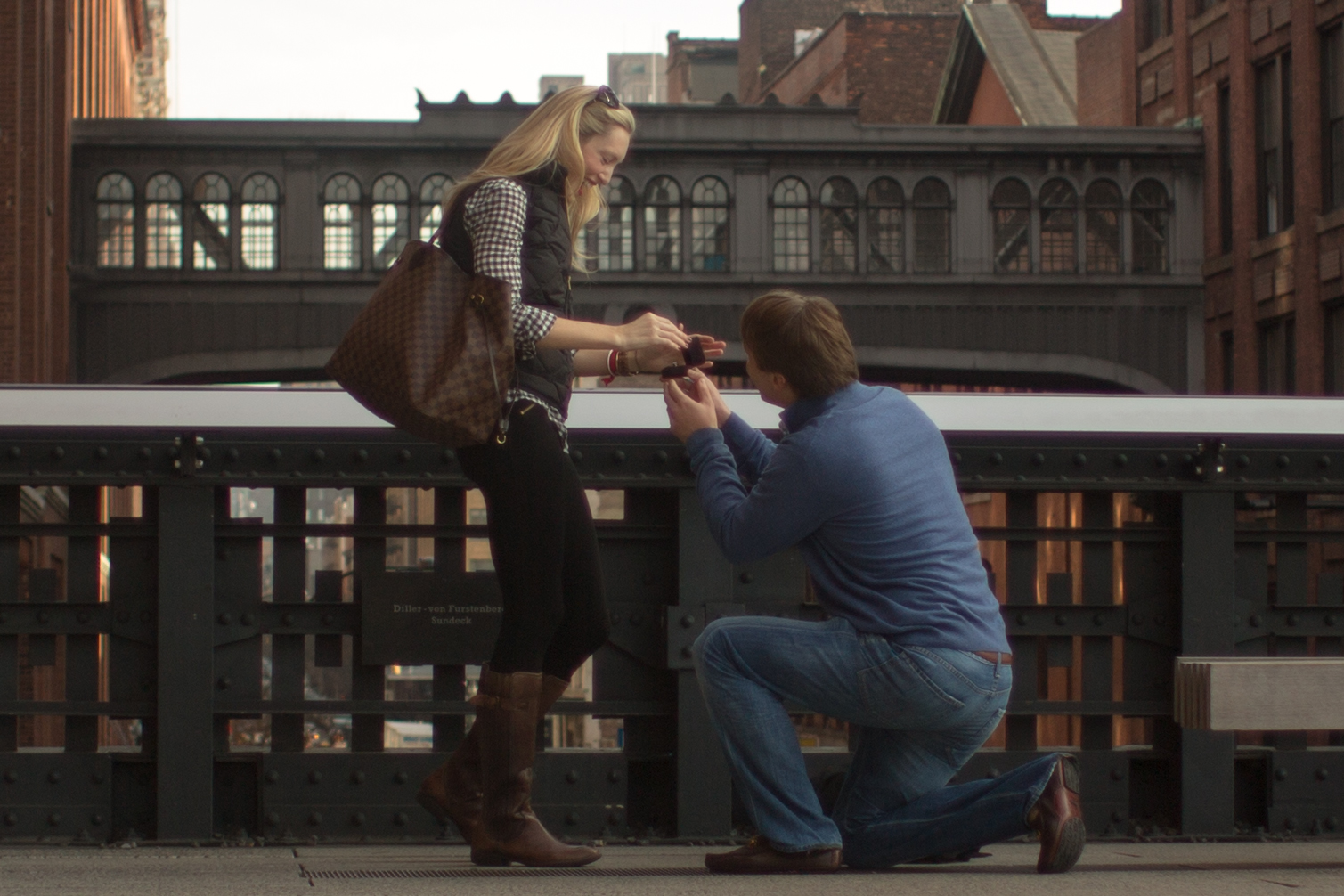
A man proposing on the High Line in New York City

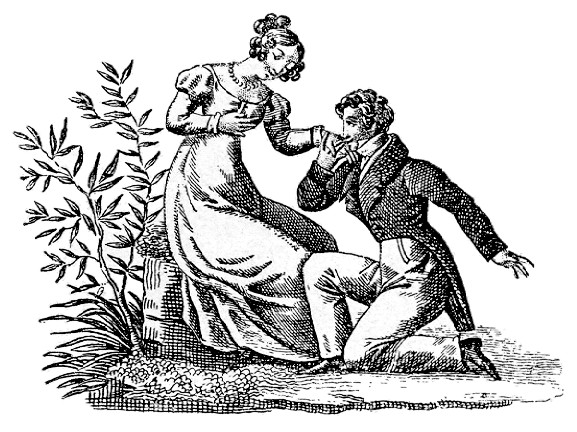
A woodcut depicting a proposal, Germany, 1815

A marriage proposal is a custom or ritual, common in Western cultures, in which one member of a couple asks the other for their hand in marriage. If accepted, it marks the initiation of engagement, a mutual promise of later marriage.

== Norms and roles ==
=== Gendered customs and roles ===
In Western cultures, a proposal is traditionally made by a man to a woman, while getting down on one knee in front of her. The ritual often involves the formal asking of the question "Will you marry me, ...?" and the presentation of an engagement ring (often in a small velvet box), which he may place on her finger if she accepts.

Before proposing, a man traditionally asks permission from the father of the woman he hopes to marry. In modern times, it is often understood as a formality.

Majority of proposals in the United States and Australia are made by men. In patriarchal societies, proposals by women may not be taken seriously or treated as "real" proposals. Some women lead the marriage proposal in private, while publicly showcasing gender essential marriage proposal conventions. Reasons some women reject gender equality for marriages include fear of rejection and preferring benevolent sexism.

=== Gender-egalitarian norms ===
When asked whether a woman doing the marriage proposal was acceptable or unacceptable, most respondents in America and Australia said acceptable. Jewelry companies have begun to advertise engagement rings for women proposing to men. Folk traditions in countries including Scotland, Ireland, England, and Finland allow women to propose on leap days, sometimes with any man rejecting such a proposal being expected to pay a forfeit to his suitor, usually through a gift of clothing. Queen Victoria proposed to Prince Albert due to royal tradition in Britain that no one can propose to a reigning monarch.

Same-gender couples, to whom gendered proposal traditions do not apply, usually keep some elements of customary ritual while altering others. In some cases, there may be multiple proposals, and each partner may propose to the other.

== Traditions ==
The proposal itself is often supposed to be a surprise, although in practice this is rarely actually the case. Surveys have found that most proposals are not surprises, and most wedding engagements begin with a conversation in which the parties mutually agree to wed.

Not all engagements begin with a proposal of marriage. Historically, many marriages have been arranged by parents or matchmakers, and these customs are still sometimes practiced in the modern day. Even when the decision to marry is made by the couple, it may not be communicated between them directly; for instance, in the traditional Japanese custom of Omiai, the formal decision to pursue marriage or to turn it down (Kotowari) is communicated between the couple's respective matchmakers.

Couples in many Christian denominations have the option of receiving the Rite of Betrothal (also known as "blessing an engaged couple" or "declaration of intention"), which often includes prayer, Bible readings, blessing of engagement rings, and a blessing of the couple.

== See also ==
- Banns of marriage
- White wedding
