= February 29 =

Day of the year

<<	February					>>
Su	Mo	Tu	We	Th	Fr	Sa
		1	2	3	4	5
6	7	8	9	10	11	12
13	14	15	16	17	18	19
20	21	22	23	24	25	26
27	28	29
2028

February 29 in recent years
2024 (Thursday)
2020 (Saturday)
2016 (Monday)
2012 (Wednesday)
2008 (Friday)
2004 (Sunday)
2000 (Tuesday)

February 29 is known as a leap day (or "leap year day"), which is periodically added as the last day of the month to the Julian and Gregorian calendars, as an intercalary date, to create leap years. Its main function is to keep the calendars aligned with the Earth's seasons, as the planet orbits the sun.

In the older Julian calendar, leap days are added to every year that is evenly divisible by four. However, this causes the calendar to slowly become misaligned with the Earth's seasons, by about 3 days every 400 years. (The Julian calendar continues to be used in some places as the basis for their liturgical calendar).

The Gregorian calendar is the standard civil calendar used in most of the world, and is a slight modification of the Julian calendar. In this calendar, a centennial year does not have a February 29 (despite being evenly divisible by 4) unless it is also evenly divisible by 400. Thus, in contrast to the Julian calendar, the years 1700, 1800 and 1900 did not have leap year days but both calendars had a February 29 in the years 1600 and 2000.

The convention of adding a "February 29" to be the leap day was not widely used before the 15th century. Instead, beginning with Julius Caesar's calendar edict of 45 BC until the 16th century (formally), February 24 was doubled – two successive days had the same date.

February 29 is the 60th day of a leap year for both the Julian and Gregorian calendars, and 306 days remain until the end of the leap year. It is also the last day of meteorological winter in the Northern Hemisphere and the last day of meteorological summer in the Southern Hemisphere in leap years.

== Events ==
=== Pre-1600 ===
- 888 – Odo, count of Paris, is crowned king of West Francia (France) by Archbishop Walter of Sens at Compiègne.
- 1504 – Christopher Columbus uses his knowledge of a lunar eclipse that night to convince Jamaican natives to provide him with supplies.

=== 1601–1900 ===
- 1644 – Abel Tasman's second Pacific voyage begins as he leaves Batavia in command of three ships.
- 1704 – In Queen Anne's War, French forces and Native Americans stage a raid on Deerfield, Massachusetts Bay Colony, killing 56 villagers and taking more than 100 captive.
- 1712 – February 29 is followed by February 30 in Sweden, in a move to abolish the Swedish calendar for a return to the Julian calendar.
- 1720 – Ulrika Eleonora, Queen of Sweden abdicates in favour of her husband, who becomes King Frederick I on March 24.
- 1768 – Polish nobles form the Bar Confederation.
- 1796 – The Jay Treaty between the United States and Great Britain comes into force, facilitating ten years of peaceful trade between the two nations.
- 1892 – St. Petersburg, Florida is incorporated.

=== 1901–present ===
- 1908 – James Madison University is founded at Harrisonburg, Virginia, United States as The State Normal and Industrial School for Women by the Virginia General Assembly.
- 1912 – The Piedra Movediza (Moving Stone) of Tandil falls and breaks.
- 1916 – Tokelau is annexed by the United Kingdom.
- 1916 – In South Carolina, the minimum working age for factory, mill and mine workers is raised from 12 to 14 years old.
- 1920 – The Czechoslovak National Assembly adopts the Constitution.
- 1924 – The Victorian Football League created the Brownlow Medal to honour deceased administrator Charles Brownlow, now awarded to the "fairest and best" player in the Australian Football League.
- 1936 – The February 26 Incident in Tokyo ends.
- 1940 – For her performance as Mammy in Gone with the Wind, Hattie McDaniel becomes the first African American to win an Academy Award.
- 1940 – Finland initiates Winter War peace negotiations.
- 1940 – In a ceremony held in Berkeley, California, physicist Ernest Lawrence receives the 1939 Nobel Prize in Physics from Sweden's consul general in San Francisco.
- 1944 – The Admiralty Islands are invaded in Operation Brewer, led by American general Douglas MacArthur, in World War II.
- 1960 – The 5.7 M_{w} Agadir earthquake shakes coastal Morocco with a maximum perceived intensity of X (Extreme), destroying Agadir and leaving 12,000 dead and another 12,000 injured.
- 1964 – British Eagle International Airlines Flight 802/6 crashes into the Glungezer mountain in the Tux Alps of Austria, killing all 75 people aboard.
- 1968 – Aeroflot Flight 15 crashes Irkutsk Oblast, Soviet Union, due to a loss of control. Eighty-three of the 84 occupants onboard die. The exact cause of the accident is unknown.
- 1972 – South Korea withdraws 11,000 of its 48,000 troops from South Vietnam as part of Nixon's Vietnamization policy in the Vietnam War.
- 1980 – Gordie Howe of the Hartford Whalers makes NHL history as he scores his 800th goal.
- 1984 – Pierre Trudeau announces his retirement as Liberal Party leader and Prime Minister of Canada.
- 1988 – South African archbishop Desmond Tutu is arrested along with 100 other clergymen during a five-day anti-apartheid demonstration in Cape Town.
- 1988 – Svend Robinson becomes the first member of the House of Commons of Canada to come out as gay.
- 1992 – A referendum is begun in Bosnia and Herzegovina for the determination of Bosnian independence.
- 1996 – Faucett Perú Flight 251 crashes in the Andes; all 123 passengers and crew are killed.
- 1996 – The Siege of Sarajevo officially ends.
- 2000 – Chechens attack a guard post near Ulus Kert, eventually killing 84 Russian paratroopers during the Second Chechen War.
- 2004 – Jean-Bertrand Aristide is removed as president of Haiti following a coup.
- 2004 – Angelina Jolie wears a White Marc Bouwer dress to the 76th Academy Awards, which has since been placed on numerous lists for best Oscars fashion.
- 2008 – The United Kingdom's Ministry of Defence withdraws Prince Harry from a tour of Afghanistan after news of his deployment is leaked to foreign media.
- 2008 – Misha Defonseca admits to fabricating her memoir, Misha: A Mémoire of the Holocaust Years, in which she claims to have lived with a pack of wolves in the woods during the Holocaust.
- 2012 – North Korea agrees to suspend uranium enrichment and nuclear and long-range missile tests in return for US food aid.
- 2016 – In the Miqdadiyah bombing: at least 40 people are killed and 58 others wounded following a suicide bombing by ISIL at a Shi'ite funeral in the city of Miqdadiyah, Diyala, Iraq.
- 2020 – During a demonstration, pro-government colectivos shoot at disputed President and Speaker of the National Assembly Juan Guaidó and his supporters in Barquisimeto, Venezuela, leaving five injured.
- 2020 – The United States and the Taliban sign the Doha Agreement for bringing peace to Afghanistan.
- 2020 – Muhyiddin Yassin is appointed as the 8th Prime Minister of Malaysia, amid the 2020 Malaysian political crisis.
- 2020 – Luxembourg becomes the first country in the world to render public transport free nationwide.
- 2024 – The Flour Massacre took place in the Gaza Strip: Israeli forces opened fire on Palestinians waiting for aid amidst the Gaza war, killing over 100 and wounding 750.

== Births ==
=== Pre-1600 ===
- 1468 – Pope Paul III (died 1549)
- 1528 – Albert V, Duke of Bavaria (died 1579)
- 1528 – Domingo Báñez, Spanish theologian (died 1604)
- 1572 – Edward Cecil, 1st Viscount Wimbledon (died 1638)
- 1576 – Antonio Neri, Florentine priest and glassmaker (died 1614)

=== 1601–1900 ===
- 1640 – Benjamin Keach, Particular Baptist preacher and author whose name is given to Keach's Catechism (died 1704)
- 1692 – John Byrom, English poet and educator (died 1763)
- 1724 – Eva Marie Veigel, Austrian-English dancer (died 1822)
- 1736 – Ann Lee, English-American religious leader, founder of the Shakers (died 1784)
- 1792 – Gioachino Rossini, Italian composer (died 1868)
- 1812 – James Milne Wilson, Scottish-Australian soldier and politician, eighth Premier of Tasmania (died 1880)
- 1828 – Emmeline B. Wells, American journalist, poet and activist (died 1921)
- 1836 – Dickey Pearce, American baseball player and manager (died 1908)
- 1840 – Theodor Leber, German ophthalmologist (died 1917)
- 1852 – Frank Gavan Duffy, Irish-Australian lawyer and judge, fourth Chief Justice of Australia (died 1936)
- 1852 – Prince George Maximilianovich, 6th Duke of Leuchtenberg (died 1912)
- 1860 – Herman Hollerith, American statistician and businessman, co-founder of the Computing-Tabulating-Recording Company (died 1929)
- 1884 – Richard S. Aldrich, American lawyer and politician (died 1941)
- 1892 – Augusta Savage, American sculptor (died 1962)
- 1896 – Morarji Desai, Indian civil servant and politician, fourth Prime Minister of India (died 1995)
- 1896 – William A. Wellman, American actor, director, producer and screenwriter (died 1975)

=== 1901–present ===
- 1904 – Jimmy Dorsey, American saxophonist, composer and bandleader (died 1957)
- 1904 – Pepper Martin, American baseball player and manager (died 1965)
- 1908 – Balthus, French-Swiss painter and illustrator (died 2001)
- 1908 – Dee Brown, American historian and author (died 2002)
- 1908 – Alf Gover, English cricketer and coach (died 2001)
- 1908 – Louie Myfanwy Thomas, Welsh writer (died 1968)
- 1912 – Kamil Tolon, Turkish industrialist (died 1978)
- 1916 – James B. Donovan, American lawyer (died 1970)
- 1916 – Leonard Shoen, founder of U-Haul Corp. (died 1999)
- 1920 – Fyodor Abramov, Russian author and critic (died 1983)
- 1920 – Arthur Franz, American actor (died 2006)
- 1920 – James Mitchell, American actor and dancer (died 2010)
- 1920 – Michèle Morgan, French-American actress and singer (died 2016)
- 1920 – Rolland W. Redlin, American lawyer and politician (died 2011)
- 1924 – David Beattie, New Zealand judge and politician, 14th Governor-General of New Zealand (died 2001)
- 1924 – Carlos Humberto Romero, Salvadoran politician, President of El Salvador (died 2017)
- 1924 – Al Rosen, American baseball player and manager (died 2015)
- 1928 – Joss Ackland, English actor (died 2023)
- 1928 – Terry Lewis (police officer), corrupt Australian police commissioner (died 2023)
- 1928 – Jean Adamson, British writer and illustrator (Topsy and Tim) (died 2024)
- 1928 – Vance Haynes, American archaeologist, geologist and author
- 1928 – Michael Henshall, English Anglican suffragan bishop (died 2017)
- 1928 – Seymour Papert, South African mathematician and computer scientist, co-creator of the Logo programming language (died 2016)
- 1928 – Tempest Storm, born Annie Banks, "The Queen Of Exotic Dancers", American burlesque performer and actress (died 2021)
- 1932 – Gene H. Golub, American mathematician and academic (died 2007)
- 1932 – Masten Gregory, American race car driver (died 1985)
- 1932 – Reri Grist, American soprano and actress
- 1932 – Jaguar, Brazilian cartoonist (died 2025)
- 1932 – Gavin Stevens, Australian cricketer
- 1936 – Nh. Dini, Indonesian writer (died 2018)
- 1936 – Jack R. Lousma, American colonel, astronaut and politician
- 1936 – Henri Richard, Canadian ice hockey player (died 2020)
- 1936 – Alex Rocco, American actor (died 2015)
- 1940 – Sonja Barend, Dutch talk show host
- 1940 – Bartholomew I, current Ecumenical Patriarch of Constantinople.
- 1944 – Dennis Farina, American police officer and actor (died 2013)
- 1944 – Nicholas Frayling, English priest and academic
- 1944 – Phyllis Frelich, American actress (died 2014)
- 1944 – Steve Mingori, American baseball player (died 2008)
- 1944 – Paolo Eleuteri Serpieri, Italian author and illustrator
- 1944 – Lennart Svedberg, Swedish ice hockey player (died 1972).
- 1944 – Saeed Poursamimi, Iranian actor
- 1948 – Hermione Lee, English author, critic and academic
- 1948 – Manoel Maria, Brazilian footballer
- 1948 – Patricia A. McKillip, American author (died 2022)
- 1948 – Sonny M'Pokomandji, Central African basketball player and politician, Minister of Equipment and Transport (2003–2005)
- 1952 – Tim Powers, American author and educator
- 1952 – Raisa Smetanina, Russian cross-country skier
- 1952 – Bart Stupak, American police officer and politician
- 1956 – Knut Agnred, Swedish singer, actor and comedian
- 1956 – Jonathan Coleman, English-Australian radio and television host (died 2021)
- 1956 – Bob Speller, Canadian businessman and politician, 30th Canadian Minister of Agriculture (died 2021)
- 1956 – Aileen Wuornos, American serial killer (died 2002)
- 1960 – Khaled, Algerian singer-songwriter
- 1960 – Richard Ramirez, American serial killer and sex offender (died 2013)
- 1960 – Tony Robbins, American author and motivational activist
- 1964 – Dave Brailsford, English cyclist and coach
- 1964 – Carmel Busuttil, former Maltese footballer
- 1964 – Lyndon Byers, Canadian ice hockey player and radio host (died 2025)
- 1964 – Mervyn Warren, American tenor, composer and producer
- 1968 – Chucky Brown, American basketball player and coach
- 1968 – Gareth Farr, New Zealand composer and percussionist
- 1968 – Pete Fenson, American curler
- 1968 – Bryce Paup, American football player and coach
- 1968 – Howard Tayler, American author and illustrator
- 1968 – Eugene Volokh, Ukrainian-American lawyer and educator
- 1968 – Frank Woodley, Australian actor, producer and screenwriter
- 1972 – Sylvie Lubamba, Italian showgirl
- 1972 – Mike Pollitt, English footballer and coach
- 1972 – Antonio Sabàto Jr., Italian-American model and actor
- 1972 – Pedro Sánchez, Prime Minister of Spain
- 1972 – Dave Williams, American singer (died 2002)
- 1972 – Saul Williams, American singer-songwriter
- 1972 – Pedro Zamora, Cuban-American activist and educator (died 1994)
- 1976 – Vonteego Cummings, American basketball player
- 1976 – Katalin Kovács, Hungarian sprint kayaker
- 1976 – Terrence Long, American baseball player
- 1976 – Ja Rule, American rapper and actor
- 1980 – Çağdaş Atan, Turkish footballer and coach
- 1980 – Simon Gagné, Canadian ice hockey player
- 1980 – Rubén Plaza, Spanish cyclist
- 1980 – Clinton Toopi, New Zealand rugby league player
- 1980 – Taylor Twellman, American soccer player and sportscaster
- 1980 – Peter Scanavino, American actor (Law & Order: Special Victims Unit)
- 1984 – Darren Ambrose, English footballer
- 1984 – Rica Imai, Japanese model and actress
- 1984 – Cullen Jones, American swimmer
- 1984 – Nuria Martínez, Spanish basketball player
- 1984 – Lena Raine, American video game composer and producer
- 1984 – Rakhee Thakrar, English actress
- 1984 – Cam Ward, Canadian ice hockey player
- 1984 – Mark Foster, American singer, songwriter and musician
- 1988 – Lena Gercke, German model and television host
- 1988 – Benedikt Höwedes, German footballer
- 1988 – Coco Khan, British writer
- 1988 – Brent Macaffer, Australian Rules footballer
- 1988 – Hannah Mills, Welsh sports sailor
- 1992 – Sean Abbott, Australian cricketer
- 1992 – Eric Kendricks, American football player
- 1992 – Jessica Long, American paralympic swimmer
- 1992 – Jessie T. Usher, American actor
- 1992 – Saphir Taïder, Algerian footballer
- 1996 – Nelson Asofa-Solomona, New Zealand rugby league player
- 1996 – Norberto Briasco, Argentine-Armenian footballer
- 1996 – Reece Prescod, British sprinter
- 1996 – Claudia Williams, New Zealand tennis player
- 2000 – Tyrese Haliburton, American basketball player
- 2000 – Ferran Torres, Spanish footballer
- 2000 – Jesper Lindstrøm, Danish footballer
- 2004 – Lydia Jacoby, American swimmer
- 2004 – Abdukodir Khusanov, Uzbek footballer
- 2008 – Rémi Himbert, French footballer

== Deaths ==
=== Pre-1600 ===
- 468 – Pope Hilarius
- 992 – Oswald of Worcester, Anglo-Saxon archbishop and saint (born 925)
- 1460 – Albert III, Duke of Bavaria-Munich (born 1401)
- 1528 – Patrick Hamilton, Scottish Protestant reformer and martyr (born 1504)
- 1592 – Alessandro Striggio, Italian composer and diplomat (born 1536/1537)
- 1600 – Caspar Hennenberger, German pastor, historian and cartographer (born 1529)

=== 1601–1900 ===
- 1604 – John Whitgift, English archbishop and academic (born 1530)
- 1712 – Johann Conrad Peyer, Swiss anatomist (born 1653)
- 1744 – John Theophilus Desaguliers, French-English physicist and philosopher (born 1683)
- 1792 – Johann Andreas Stein, German piano builder (born 1728)
- 1820 – Johann Joachim Eschenburg, German historian and critic (born 1743)
- 1848 – Louis-François Lejeune, French general, painter and lithographer (born 1775)
- 1856 – Auguste Chapdelaine, French Christian missionary (born 1814)
- 1868 – Ludwig I of Bavaria (born 1786)
- 1880 – James Milne Wilson, Scottish-Australian soldier and politician, 8th Premier of Tasmania (born 1812)

=== 1901–present ===
- 1904 – Patrick O'Sullivan, Irish-Australian politician (born 1818)
- 1904 – Henri Joseph Anastase Perrotin, French astronomer (born 1845)
- 1908 – Pat Garrett, American sheriff (born 1850)
- 1908 – John Hope, 1st Marquess of Linlithgow, Scottish-Australian politician, 1st Governor-General of Australia (born 1860)
- 1916 – John Nanson, English-Australian journalist and politician (born 1863)
- 1920 – Ernie Courtney, American baseball player (born 1875)
- 1924 – Frederic Chapple, Australian educator (born 1845)
- 1928 – Adolphe Appia, Swiss architect and theorist (born 1862)
- 1928 – Ina Coolbrith, American poet and librarian (born 1841)
- 1932 – Arthur Mills Lea, Australian entomologist (born 1868)
- 1932 – Giuseppe Vitali, Italian mathematician (born 1875)
- 1940 – E. F. Benson, English archaeologist and author (born 1867)
- 1944 – Pehr Evind Svinhufvud, Finnish lawyer, judge and politician, 3rd President of Finland (born 1861)
- 1948 – Robert Barrington-Ward, English lawyer and journalist (born 1891)
- 1952 – Sarah Ann Jenyns, Australian entrepreneur (born 1865)
- 1956 – Elpidio Quirino, Filipino lawyer and politician, 6th President of the Philippines (born 1890)
- 1960 – Melvin Purvis, American police officer and FBI agent (born 1903)
- 1960 – Walter Yust, American journalist and author (born 1894)
- 1964 – Frank Albertson, American actor and singer (born 1909)
- 1968 – Tore Ørjasæter, Norwegian poet and educator (born 1886)
- 1972 – Tom Davies, American football player and coach (born 1896)
- 1976 – Florence P. Dwyer, American politician (born 1902)
- 1980 – Yigal Allon, Israeli general and politician, Prime Minister of Israel (born 1918)
- 1980 – Gil Elvgren, American painter and illustrator (born 1914)
- 1984 – Ludwik Starski, Polish screenwriter and songwriter (born 1903)
- 1992 – Ruth Pitter, English poet and author (born 1897)
- 1996 – Frank Daniel, Czech-American director, producer and screenwriter (born 1926)
- 1996 – Wes Farrell, American singer-songwriter and producer (born 1939)
- 1996 – Ralph Rowe, American baseball player, coach and manager (born 1924)
- 2000 – Dennis Danell, American guitarist (born 1961)
- 2004 – Kagamisato Kiyoji, Japanese sumo wrestler, the 42nd Yokozuna (born 1923)
- 2004 – Jerome Lawrence, American playwright and author (born 1915)
- 2004 – Harold Bernard St. John, Barbadian lawyer and politician, 3rd Prime Minister of Barbados (born 1931)
- 2004 – Lorrie Wilmot, South African cricketer (born 1943)
- 2008 – Janet Kagan, American author (born 1946)
- 2008 – Erik Ortvad, Danish painter and illustrator (born 1917)
- 2008 – Akira Yamada, Japanese scholar and philosopher (born 1922)
- 2012 – Davy Jones, English singer, guitarist and actor (born 1945)
- 2012 – Sheldon Moldoff, American illustrator (born 1920)
- 2012 – P. K. Narayana Panicker, Indian social leader (born 1930)
- 2016 – Wenn V. Deramas, Filipino director and screenwriter (born 1966)
- 2016 – Gil Hill, American police officer, actor and politician (born 1931)
- 2016 – Josefin Nilsson, Swedish singer (born 1969)
- 2016 – Mumtaz Qadri, Pakistani assassin, executed (born 1985)
- 2016 – Louise Rennison, English author (born 1951)
- 2020 – Dieter Laser, German actor (born 1942)
- 2020 – Éva Székely, Hungarian Hall of Fame swimmer and 1952 Olympic champion (born 1927)
- 2024 – Ali Hassan Mwinyi, 2nd President of Tanzania and 3rd President of Zanzibar (born 1925)
- 2024 – Brian Mulroney, 18th Prime Minister of Canada (born 1939)

== Holidays and observances ==
- As a Christian feast day:
  - Saint John Cassian
  - February 29 in the Orthodox church
- Rare Disease Day (in leap years; usually celebrated in common years on February 28)
- Bachelor's Day (Ireland and United Kingdom)

== See also ==
- List of non-standard dates
