= Bachelor's Day (tradition) =

Tradition associated with February 29

Bachelor's Day, sometimes known as Ladies' Privilege, is an Irish tradition by which women are allowed to propose to men on Leap Day, 29 February, based on a legend of Saint Bridget and Saint Patrick. It once had legal basis in Scotland and England.

== History ==
The tradition is supposed to originate from a deal that Saint Bridget struck with Saint Patrick. In the 5th century, Bridget is said to have gone to Patrick to complain that women had to wait too long to marry because men were slow to propose, asking that women be given the opportunity. Patrick is said to have offered that women be allowed to propose on one day every seven years, but Bridget convinced him to make it one day every four years.

The tradition also has background in the number of late February proposals encouraged by how undesirable it was to be unmarried during Lent, because of social responsibility to marry combined with the ban on marrying during the Lent observance. People who were single by Easter would be publicly named in Skellig Lists, ballads about single people, and harassed in the streets from the Sunday after Shrove Tuesday, known as Chalk Sunday, and throughout Lent. The term "Skellig List" comes from the name of the Skellig Islands and particularly the largest, Skellig Michael, where Lent was believed to start later than in the rest of Ireland, providing a last opportunity to quickly wed.

Bachelor's Day was well established by the 1800s. Several stories of the tradition were then collected by the Irish Folklore Commission between 1937 and 1939, as part of an educational curriculum project.

== Irish tradition ==
The custom is reported to allow women to initiate dances and propose marriage. There are also traditions for if the proposal was refused, namely that the man would have to give recompense to the woman. This could come in different forms, though typically the man was expected to buy the woman gloves, a silk gown or, by the mid-20th century, a fur coat. He may have also had to perform a juggling trick on Easter Day. In some areas a woman could propose for the entire leap year.

A related tradition is Puss Sunday. On either the last Sunday before, or the first Sunday after, Ash Wednesday, single women were reported to "have a puss", from the word pus being a term for scowling, but on Leap Years men would have the puss. This appears to be a kinder form of Chalk Sunday. Some records also include mention that it is traditionally unlucky to actually marry in February of a Leap Year.

== Internationally ==
Similar traditions can be found in other countries, particularly in Scotland. It is also observed in other parts of the United Kingdom and in Finland. By the early 20th century, the tradition had reached the United States, but was treated misogynistically, being ridiculed in newspapers and postcards.

In some parts of Europe, if a woman proposed and the man refused, he would have to buy her twelve pairs of gloves, supposedly to hide the fact she was not wearing a ring.

=== Scotland ===
Irish monks took the tradition to Scotland. It has been widely reported that in 1288, it was made into a law that women could propose during leap years, that they must wear a red petticoat while proposing, and that refusals would result in a fine. This was supposedly decreed by the young, unmarried Queen Margaret, who was in fact 5 years old at the time. The "fine" could be a kiss, or the traditional silk dress or gloves. However, the fine and the red petticoat having the force of law have no basis in historical fact, though there was a superstition that a man declining such a proposal from a woman wearing a red petticoat would have bad luck.

The fine comes from the story of Saint Bridget and Saint Patrick, where Bridget is said to have immediately proposed to Patrick after he allowed women to, but Patrick turned her down, giving her a kiss on the cheek and a silk dress.

=== England ===
In traditional English law, 29 February was not a legal day, so the legal bar at that time on women proposing would not apply during a leap year. This may have begun the tradition there.

=== United States ===
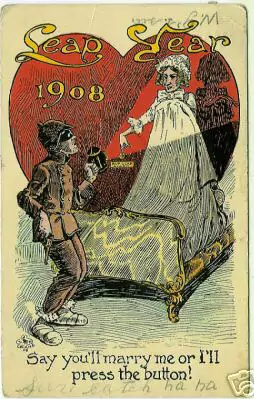
American postcard about the tradition in 1908

The first record of the tradition in the United States is in 1860, when Ralph Waldo Emerson wrote that his daughter had mentioned a "leap year dance", where the men sit around waiting to be invited by the women. It became more known in the early 20th century, but was the butt of jokes about unmarried, romantically aggressive, women. Cartoons were published mocking the concept in various forms, commonly depicting women discussing the use of, or using, aggressive measures like nets and guns to capture unwitting men. The societal impact of the tradition in the United States has been described as reinforcing gender stereotypes that suggest women should not propose, as it was treated as a joke to let them do so on Leap Day; a similar American tradition was to have women take leadership positions and arbitrarily run local councils on Leap Day, which was treated similarly to suggest that women should not have these roles. Both traditions died out by 1980, when women's roles in relationships were more equal (and when the workplace swap became seen as entirely misogynistic).

The 2010 American film Leap Year tells the story of a woman traversing around Ireland to find her boyfriend to propose on the day, and the tradition may have led to the day being used as Sadie Hawkins Day.
