= 2016 Miqdadiyah bombing =

Terrorist incident in Iraq

Miqdadiyah bombing
- Part of Iraqi Civil War (2014–2017)
- Location: Muqdadiya, Diyala, Iraq
- Date: 29 February 2016
- Attack type: Suicide bombing
- Deaths: 40
- Injuries: 58
- Perpetrator: Islamic State

The death toll in a suicide bombing in Iraq's eastern province of Diyala rose to 50. A further 58 people were wounded in the attack at a funeral for a Shi'ite Muslim militia fighter in Muqdadiya, 80 km (50 miles) northeast of Baghdad.

== See also ==
- List of terrorist incidents, January–June 2016
