= Erasmus bus crash =

2016 road incident in Spain

Coordinates: 40.6600°N 0.5111°E

Details
- Date: 20 March 2016
- Location: Freginals, Catalonia, Spain
- Incident type: traffic accident
- Cause: Under investigation, weariness of the driver (suspected)

Statistics
- Deaths: 13
- Injured: 43
- Damage: A bus

On 20 March 2016, a Tata Hispano passenger bus carrying Erasmus students from several countries coming from the Fallas Festival in Valencia to Barcelona collided with a car on the Autopista AP-7 motorway, near the town of Freginals. Thirteen died – all of them young female students.

Emergency services confirmed that the students on the affected bus were from 20 countries or territories: France, the Netherlands, Finland, Hungary, Germany, Sweden, Norway, Switzerland, the Czech Republic, New Zealand, Great Britain, Italy, Peru, Bulgaria, Macedonia, Poland, Ireland, the Palestinian territories, Japan and Ukraine.

The fatalities were seven Italians, two Germans, a Romanian, an Uzbek, a French and an Austrian.

The bus driver died of a heart attack on 6 April 2023.
