= Cuba Libre bar fire =

Fire at the Cuba Libre bar in Rouen, Normandy, France

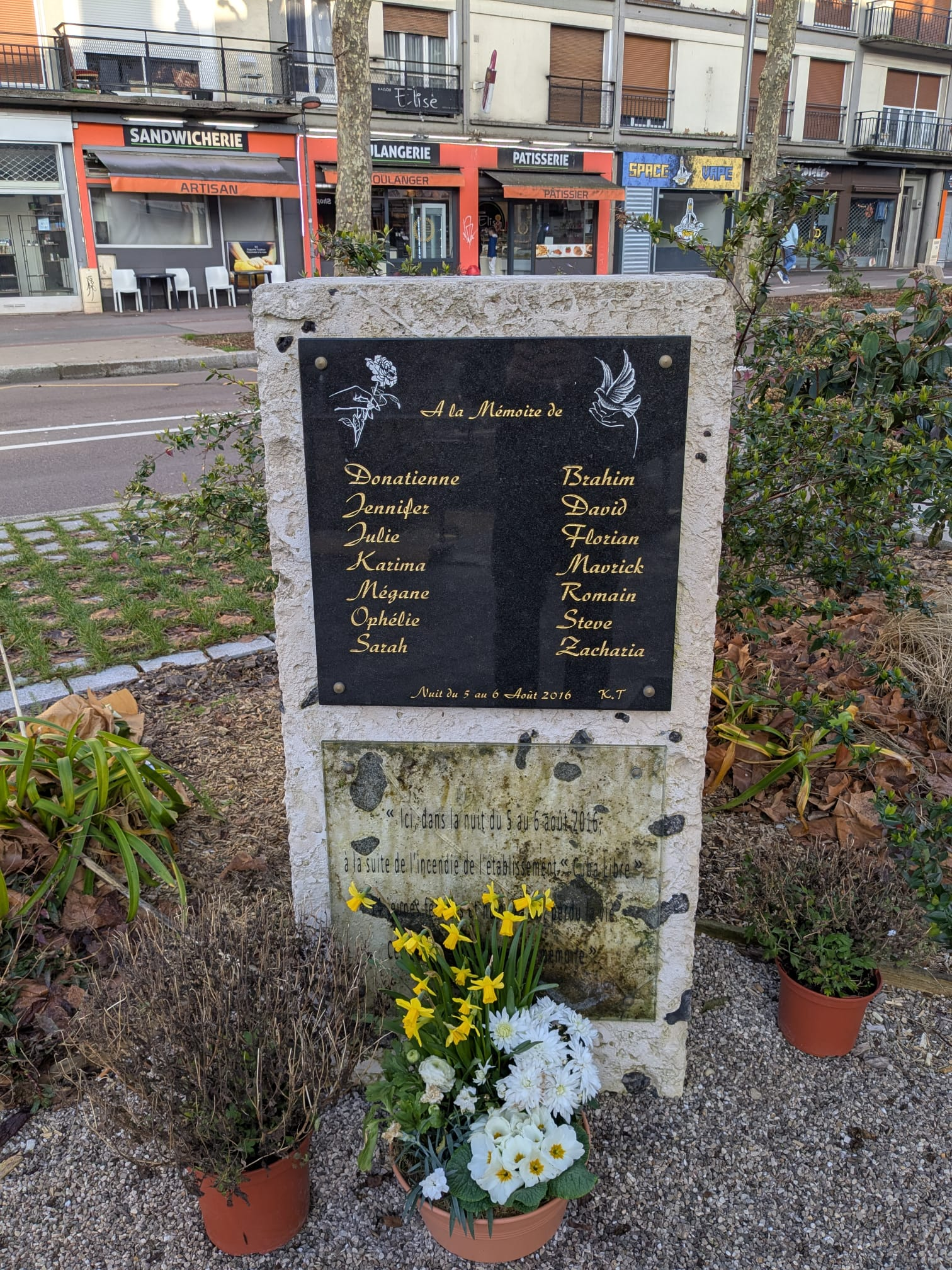
- Date: 6 August 2016
- Time: c. 00:50 (UTC+02:00)
- Location: Rouen, France; 49.4358°N 1.0866°E
- Cause: Accidental ignition of ceiling tiles
- Deaths: 14
- Injuries: 6

On 6 August 2016, 14 youths were killed in a fire at the Cuba Libre bar in Rouen, Seine-Maritime, France.

== Event ==
The fire started shortly before 00:50 on 6 August, when firefighters were called to the Cuba Libre bar in Rouen. The bar was hosting a private birthday party. The fire was initially reported as being caused by an "accidental explosion," but this was subsequently refuted by the local authority. The blaze took 30 minutes to put out. Thirteen people were dead at the scene from smoke inhalation while a fourteenth victim died of burn injuries in a month later in September.

Rouen's Vice Prosecutor Laurent Labadie told the Associated Press that the first testimonies from survivors and early results from the police investigation indicated that the "fire was completely accidental." "There was no explosion," Labadie told the AP. "Candles on a birthday cake started the fire after the person who carried it tripped on the stairs leading to the basement."

The fire had occurred in a basement section of the bar that had been illegally converted into a nightclub. The candles of the birthday cake and sparkler fountain pyrotechnics had ignited the ceiling of the staircase, with the flames spreading to the rest of the basement, which was lined with polyurethane foam as soundproofing material. An emergency exit had been padlocked by the bar's owners.

In light of the tragedy, 35 other drinking establishments with upper floors or basements were inspected for fire safety. Only ten were found to be in compliance with safety regulations, with the rest either having to close their additional spaces or shutting down completely for renovations. A renewed inspection in 2019 rated twenty establishments as compliant, twelve as lacking complete measures, one which required intervention by Rouen authorities and two that had to be closed down permanently.

In 2018, a memorial was erected for the victims.

In October 2019, Rouen Criminal Court convicted the two club managers of involuntary homicide and involuntary bodily harm, sentencing them five years imprisonment and a ban from managing businesses. They were released on parole in January 2021. One of the managers was initially expelled from French territory, but on 7 July 2022, the measure was overturned by the court, as it was reasoned that he did not pose a danger to the public since the ban on manager positions precluded him from reoffending in the same manner.
