= List of mass shootings in Austria =

This article is a list of mass shootings in Austria. Mass shootings are firearm-related violence with at least four casualties.

The data includes casualties of perpetrators, including self-inflicted gunshot or shooting of a perpetrator by police. The treatment of perpetrator casualties is at variance to some but not all definitions of a mass shooting used in the United States. The inclusion of injured victims in the data is also at variance with some of the US definitions that only include dead victims. However, the above treatment is consistent with that used in other Wikipedia lists of mass shootings by country.

== 21st century ==
Date	Location	Dead	Injured	Total	Description
16 September 2025	Leopoldstadt, Vienna	3 (Note: Including the perpetrator or suspect)	1	4	A 44-year-old man shot and killed his ex-wife and wounded her daughter and the daughter's boyfriend before exchanging gunfire with police and killing himself. The daughter died of her injuries two days later.
10 June 2025	Graz, Styria	11	11	22	Graz school shooting: A former student of Dreierschützengasse secondary school entered the school and he opened fire in at least two classrooms. The man shot and killed 10 people and injured at least 11 others. The gunman died from a self-inflicted gunshot wound. The shooting is the deadliest rampage killing in modern Austrian history.
2 November 2020	Innere Stadt, Vienna	5	23	28	2020 Vienna attack: An ISIL sympathiser opened fire on civilians in the city centre of Vienna. The man shot and killed 4 people and injured 23 others, seven critically, including a police officer.
6 October 2019	Kitzbühel, Tyrol	5	0	5	A man shot and killed five members of his ex-partner's family, including his former girlfriend.
28 or 29 November 2016	Böheimkirchen, Lower Austria	6	0	6	A woman shot and killed five members of her family before turning the gun on herself.
22 May 2016	Nenzing, Vorarlberg	3	11	14	2016 Nenzing shooting: A man shot and killed 2 people and injured 11 others following a heated argument between the perpetrator and his girlfriend. He died from a self-inflicted gunshot wound.
16–17 September 2013	Annaberg and Melk, Lower Austria	5	1	6	2013 Annaberg shooting: A suspected poacher killed several police officers and a Red Cross paramedic in Annaberg before he kidnapped another officer while fleeing to his house in Melk before killing the police hostage. He would later died from self-immolation wounds.
22 February 2013	Vienna	0	4	4	Four people were shot and wounded in Ottakring.
24 May 2009	Vienna	1	19+ (4 by gunfire) (Note: Including the perpetrator(s) or suspect(s))	20+	During a service at a Sikh temple, six men armed with knives and a pistol attacked the preachers. Including four attackers that were assaulted by bystanders, sixteen people were injured. At least five people were shot, including a guru that later died of his injuries.
1 July 2008	Strasshof, Lower Austria	4	0	4	A man shot and killed his sister, brother and their spouses, before fleeing the scene. He was arrested in August after weeks on the run.

== 20th century ==
Date	Location	Dead	Injured	Total	Description
20 November 1997	Mauterndorf, Salzburg	7 (Note: Including the perpetrator or suspect)	0	7	1997 Mauterndorf shooting: A man armed with two handguns killed six people before killing himself.
10 March 1995	Urfahr, Upper Austria	6	2	8	1995 Urfahr shooting: A man armed with a handgun opened fire in a courtroom killing five and wounding two. He escaped the scene and fatally shot himself.
8/9 September 1990	Floridsdorf, Vienna	6	4	10	A man armed with a handgun killed five people and wounded four others before killing himself.
16 May 1990	Vienna/Tulln District, Lower Austria	5	0	5	A man shot and killed his wife and two children and set their apartment on fire. He then drove to Tulln and killed his mother before killing himself.
29 August 1981	Innere Stadt, Vienna	2	18	20	1981 Vienna synagogue attack: Two terrorists of the Abu Nidal Organization kill two people and wounded 18 others attending a Bar mitzvah service at the Stadttempel in Vienna in a shooting and grenade attack.
22 June 1973	Landstraße, Vienna	0	4	4	1973 Rennweg Barracks shooting: A man opened fire on officers during a questioning, wounding four.
18 April 1972	Vienna	0	4	4	Four people were wounded during a robbery when a shootout ensued between the robbers and a police officer assigned to guard the money transport robbed.
1–2 June 1954	Vienna	1	4	5	Two intoxicated British soldiers wounded a military policeman, then opened fire the following morning at random people and motorists, killing a driver and wounding a pedestrian. A passenger of the dead driver was injured in the resulting crash. The soldiers went to an apartment complex and fired into an apartment, wounding two people, then surrendered to responding police.
29 March 1948	Josefsberg, Lower Austria	2	14+	16+	At least one drunken Soviet soldier opened fire at a restaurant, killing two people and wounding several others.
17 April 1916	Vienna, Austria-Hungary	5	7	12	A soldier shot and killed five people and wounded seven others.
6 October 1902	Droyssig, Austria-Hungary	4	3	7	A 40-year-old teacher shot and killed three students and wounded three others before being lynched by villagers.

== See also ==
- Crime in Austria
