= 2016 Nenzing shooting =

Mass shooting in Vorarlberg, Austria

- Location: Nenzing, Vorarlberg, Austria
- Date: 22 May 2016 c. 3:07 a.m. – c. 3:17 a.m. (CEST)
- Target: Music concert attendants
- Attack type: Murder–suicide, mass shooting
- Weapon: Zastava M92 carbine
- Deaths: 3 (including the perpetrator)
- Injuries: 12
- Perpetrator: Gregor Schallert

In the early morning of 22 May 2016, a mass shooting took place at a music concert in Nenzing, Vorarlberg, Austria. Two people were killed and twelve others were injured before the perpetrator killed himself.

The shooting was the first mass shooting in Vorarlberg and the only such incident in the state as of 2026.

== Attack ==
At around midnight, the perpetrator got into a fight with his girlfriend, who was holding their 17-month-old son, at the parking lot next to an open-air rock music concert, organised by The Lords motorcycle club to celebrate the MC's 30-year anniversary. He left the premises on foot, walking to his workplace in Nüziders. He was stopped by a police patrol along the way, who noticed his drunken state, but let him go without further notice. At his workplace, the perpetrator used a company car to drive to his home in Braz, where he retrieved two Zastava M92 AK-type assault rifles. He then returned to the parking lot and got into another argument with his girlfriend.

Mid-conversation with his girlfriend, the perpetrator went to his car, took out one rifle and began firing at the nearby concert crowd from an elevated railroad, about 80 meters above the venue's bar, on the edge of the concert. Individual gunshots were fired at irregular intervals over the course of ten minutes, during which 130 emergency calls were made. According to the police, 150 people were present at the concert ground at the time.

Upon emptying the rifle's magazine, the perpetrator returned to the parking lot and loaded the rifle with a second magazine from the car. He was forced into a nearby field by three or four members of The Lords MC, who had followed him from the venue and ordered the perpetrator to drop his weapon and leave the premises. The perpetrator then pointed the rifle at one of the men and threatened to kill him, with the biker responding "Dann musst du mir in die Augen schauen" ("Then you must look me in the eyes"), at which point, the perpetrator committed suicide by shooting himself in the mouth. His girlfriend was not harmed, although he reportedly fired several gunshot while standing directly next to her and their child. She ran to safety during the shooting and identified her boyfriend as the gunman to responding police. Over thirty gunshots were fired in total.

== Victims ==
Two people were killed in the attack. They were two men, aged 33 and 48, and from Nenzing and Lustenau respectively. They were buried on 5 and 10 June 2016. Twelve people were left injured, two of whom sustained life-threatening wounds. One of the injured was a Swiss national. As of 2 June, three victims remained in stationary care, including one in critical condition by 5 June. The final injured victim was treated at Landeskrankenhaus Feldkirch and Berufsgenossenschaftliche Unfallklinik Murnau for a total of eight months, remaining paralysed below the waist. None of the victims were previously known to police.

== Perpetrator ==
Police initially declined to make statements regarding the perpetrator's past criminal record or whether he owned a licence for the weapon, but stated that he was 26 years old and a resident of Bludenz District. Police later released his partial name, Gregor S., in accordance with privacy laws, with international media further identifying him as Gregor Schallert. He was friends with the organizer of the concert and had previously attended concerts without incident. One of the injured was an acquaintance of Schallert.

Schallert was a neo-Nazi skinhead, associated with the white power music network Blood & Honour until 2013. He had eight prior convictions between 2005 and 2010, consisting of assaults, dangerous threats, and violation of gun laws. The earliest offence was an assault on Antifa members at a punk music concert in December 2005, when he and other neo-Nazis attacked the group with gas pistols, knives, pepper spray, and baseballs bats. Schallert already had a ban on owning firearms since 2004, when a gas pistol was found on the then teenaged Schallert during a police interrogation of several neo-Nazis. He unsuccessfully filed for a reversal of the ban in 2015 and continued to be under observation by the Federal Office for the Protection of the Constitution and Counterterrorism. He remained a supporter of various far-right figures such as FPÖ politician Heinz-Christian Strache, Holocaust denial activist Horst Mahler, and neo-Nazi activist Ursula Haverbeck, as well as a subscriber of the neo-Nazi blog Alpen-Donau.info and webpages associated with the Identitarian movement, the National Front, and the Saxony branch of Europäische Aktion. A search of Schallert's house found additional firearms, grenades, ammunition, and writings containing far-right content. The origin of the weapons was never determined.

=== Motive ===
Police initially believed that the shooting was motivated by the argument immediately before the shooting. However, investigators discounted the theory since Schallert moved his girlfriend out of the way of the gunshots. Psychologist Reinhard Haller suggested that the shooting was "a classic rampage killing [...] committed solely to let out his frustration and aggression". The motive remains disputed.

== Aftermath ==
On 23 May, the Austrian Mauthausen Committee condemned the shooting as an example of far-right violence, urging the government to take action against far-right groups. The statement was supported by the Greens. On 27 May, a wake was held by 1,500 members and supporters of The Lords MC. On 29 May, a 20-year-old neo-Nazi was arrested by EKO Cobra for threatening a copycat mass shooting targeting asylum seekers.

The Lords MC had stated before the shooting that the festival was meant to be their last to celebrate the 30th-anniversary of its founding, but the following year in May 2017, the club organised a memorial ride to commemorate the victims of the shooting, followed by a fundraising event for Gerhard Hummer, the most severely injured of the wounded. Hummer separately received €3,400 raised by a bake sale organised by his employer a month earlier for the acquisition of an electric wheelchair. Attempts for restitution for the victims and their families made through the court system made that same year were unsuccessful. In May 2026, on the 10th anniversary of the shooting, a benefit concert was held in nearby Bludenz for Hummer, organised by Werner Pultar, another survivor of the shooting who reanimated Hummer at the scene.
