= St. Anton im Montafon railway station =

Railway station in Vorarlberg, Austria

St. Anton im Montafon

General information
- Location: Montafonerstraße 1; 6771 Sankt Anton im Montafon; Austria
- Coordinates: 47°06′36.126″N 09°51′58.5144″E
- Owner: Montafonerbahn
- Operator: Montafonerbahn
- Line: Bludenz–Schruns railway

History
- Opened: 1905

Services
Preceding station	Vorarlberg S-Bahn	Following station
Lorüns towards Bludenz	S4	Vandans towards Schruns
Location
- Location within Austria Location within Vorarlberg

St. Anton im Montafon railway station (German: Bahnhof St. Anton im Montafon) is a railway station in Sankt Anton im Montafon in the Bludenz district of the Austrian federal state of Vorarlberg. The station is located on the Bludenz–Schruns railway and is owned and operated by the Montafonerbahn (MBS).

== Services ==
As of the December 2023 timetable change, the following regional train services exist:

- Vorarlberg S-Bahn S4: half-hourly service to Bludenz and Schruns.

== See also ==
- History of rail transport in Austria
- Rail transport in Austria
