= Schlins-Beschling railway station =

Railway station in Vorarlberg, Austria

Schlins-Beschling

General information
- Location: Gewerbestraße 1; 6824 Schlins; Austria
- Coordinates: 47°11′43.1952″N 09°41′25.7532″E
- Owner: Austrian Federal Railways (ÖBB)
- Operator: ÖBB
- Line: Vorarlberg railway

History
- Opened: 1 July 1872

Services
Preceding station	Vorarlberg S-Bahn	Following station
Nenzing towards Bludenz	S1	Frastanz towards Lindau-Insel
Location
- Location within Austria

Schlins-Beschling railway station (German: Bahnhof Schlins-Beschling) is a railway station in Schlins in the Feldkirch district of the Austrian federal state of Vorarlberg. It is located on the Vorarlberg railway and serves the towns of Schlins and Beschling.

The station is owned and operated by Austrian Federal Railways (ÖBB).

== Services ==
As of the December 2023 timetable change, the following regional train service calls at Schlins-Beschling station (the S1 is also part of Bodensee S-Bahn):

- Vorarlberg S-Bahn S1: half-hourly service between Bludenz and Bregenz Hafen, with some trains continuing to Lindau-Insel.

== See also ==
- Rail transport in Austria
