= Braz railway station =

Defunct railway station in Vorarlberg, Austria

Braz
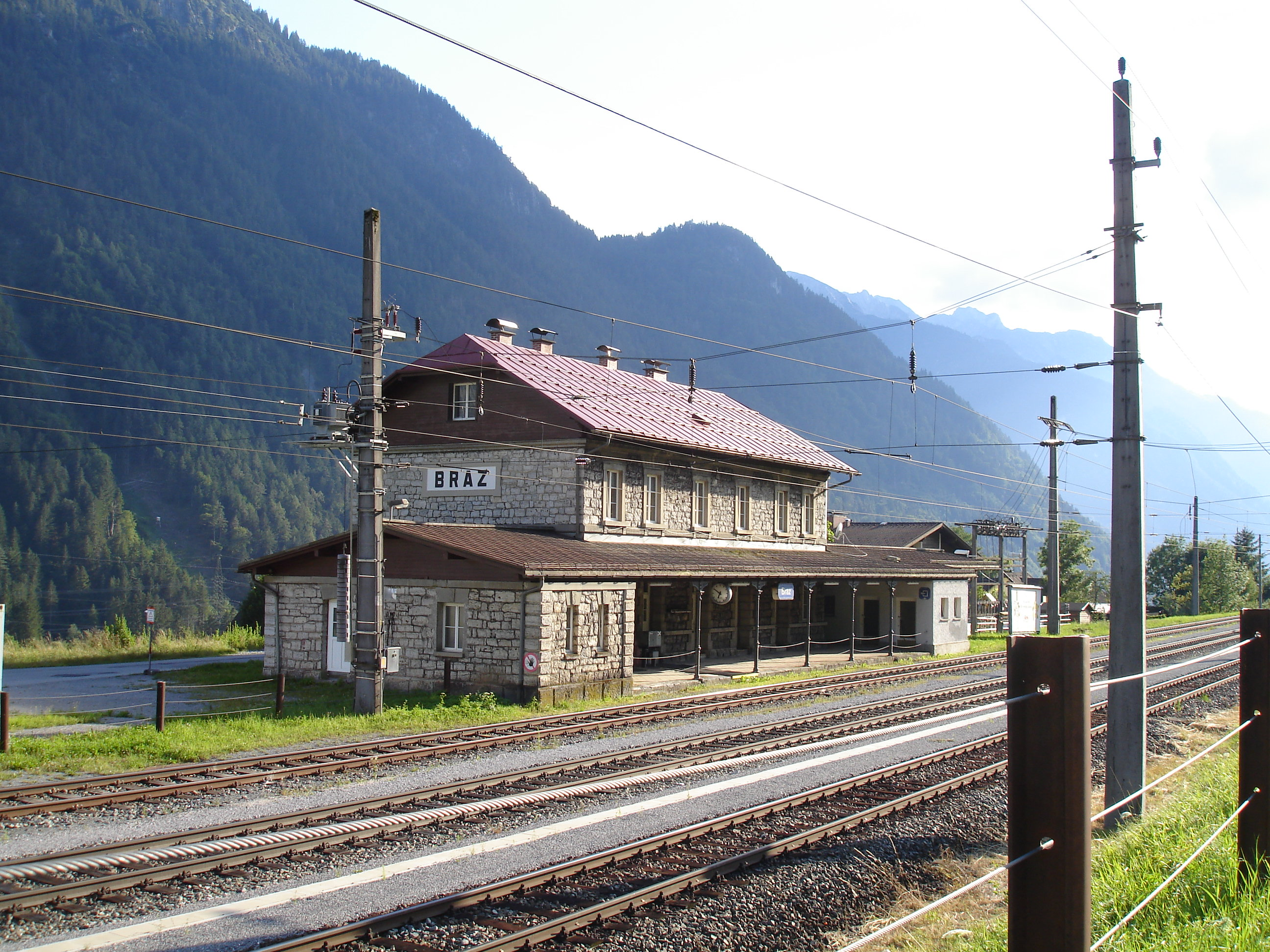
- Former station building in 2022

General information
- Location: Bahnhofstraße 2; 6751 Innerbraz; Austria
- Coordinates: 47°08′52.8324″N 09°53′54.6972″E
- Elevation: 705 m (AA)
- Owner: Austrian Federal Railways (ÖBB)
- Line: Arlberg Railway

History
- Closed: May 1999
Location
- Location within Austria

Braz railway station (German: Bahnhof Braz) was a railway station in the municipality of Innerbraz (Bludenz District) in the westernmost Austrian state of Vorarlberg.

== Description ==
Braz station is located in the Klostertal on the western slope of the Arlberg Railway line between Bludenz and Dalaas. It was closed for passenger train services in May 1999 together with other stations between Bludenz and Langen am Arlberg. The next station to the east is Hintergasse, which is also defunct.

Until August 2021, railway traffic was controlled by a local signaller, but since then the station is operated remotely from Innsbruck.

== See also ==
- Arlberg Railway Tunnel
- Arlberg
