= Ludesch railway station =

Railway station in Vorarlberg, Austria

Ludesch
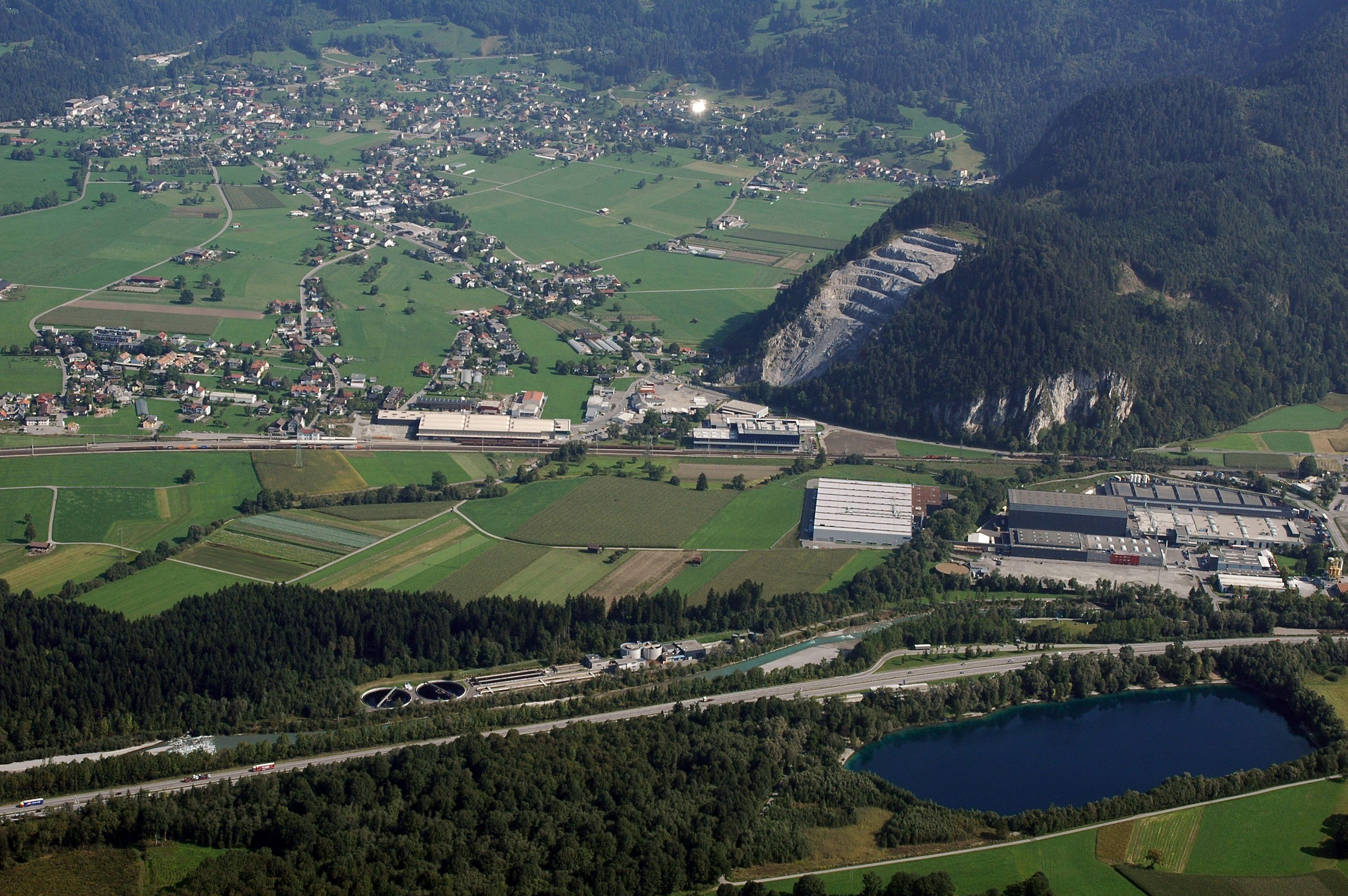
- The station is seen on the left side

General information
- Location: Gewerbestraße 1; 6713 Ludesch; Austria
- Coordinates: 47°10′49.0728″N 09°46′16.446″E
- Owner: Austrian Federal Railways (ÖBB)
- Operator: ÖBB
- Line: Vorarlberg railway

History
- Opened: 1 July 1872

Services
Preceding station	Vorarlberg S-Bahn	Following station
Nüziders towards Bludenz	S1	Nenzing towards Lindau-Insel
Location
- Location within Austria Location within Vorarlberg

Ludesch railway station (German: Bahnhof Ludesch), formerly called Ludesch-Thüringen or Großwalsertal railway station, respectively, is a railway station in Ludesch in the Bludenz district of the Austrian federal state of Vorarlberg. It is located on the Vorarlberg railway.

The station is owned and operated by Austrian Federal Railways (ÖBB).

== Services ==
As of the December 2023 timetable change, the following regional train service calls at Ludesch station (the S1 is also part of Bodensee S-Bahn):

- Vorarlberg S-Bahn S1: half-hourly service between Bludenz and Bregenz Hafen, with some trains continuing to Lindau-Insel.

== See also ==
- Rail transport in Austria
