= Nüziders railway station =

Railway station in Vorarlberg, Austria

Nüziders

General information
- Location: Bahnhofstraße 90; 6740 Nüziders; Austria
- Coordinates: 47°10′15.5424″N 09°47′40.1928″E
- Owner: Austrian Federal Railways (ÖBB)
- Operator: ÖBB
- Line: Vorarlberg railway

History
- Opened: 1 July 1872

Services
Preceding station	Vorarlberg S-Bahn	Following station
Bludenz Terminus	S1	Ludesch towards Lindau-Insel
Location
- Location within Austria Location within Vorarlberg

Nüziders railway station (German: Bahnhof Nüziders) is a railway station in Nüziders in the Bludenz district of the Austrian federal state of Vorarlberg. It is located on the Vorarlberg railway.

The station is owned and operated by Austrian Federal Railways (ÖBB).

== Services ==
As of the December 2023 timetable change, the following regional train service calls at Nüziders station (the S1 is also part of Bodensee S-Bahn):

- Vorarlberg S-Bahn S1: half-hourly service between Bludenz and Bregenz Hafen, with some trains continuing to Lindau-Insel.

== See also ==
- Rail transport in Austria
