= Nenzing railway station =

Railway station in Vorarlberg, Austria

Nenzing
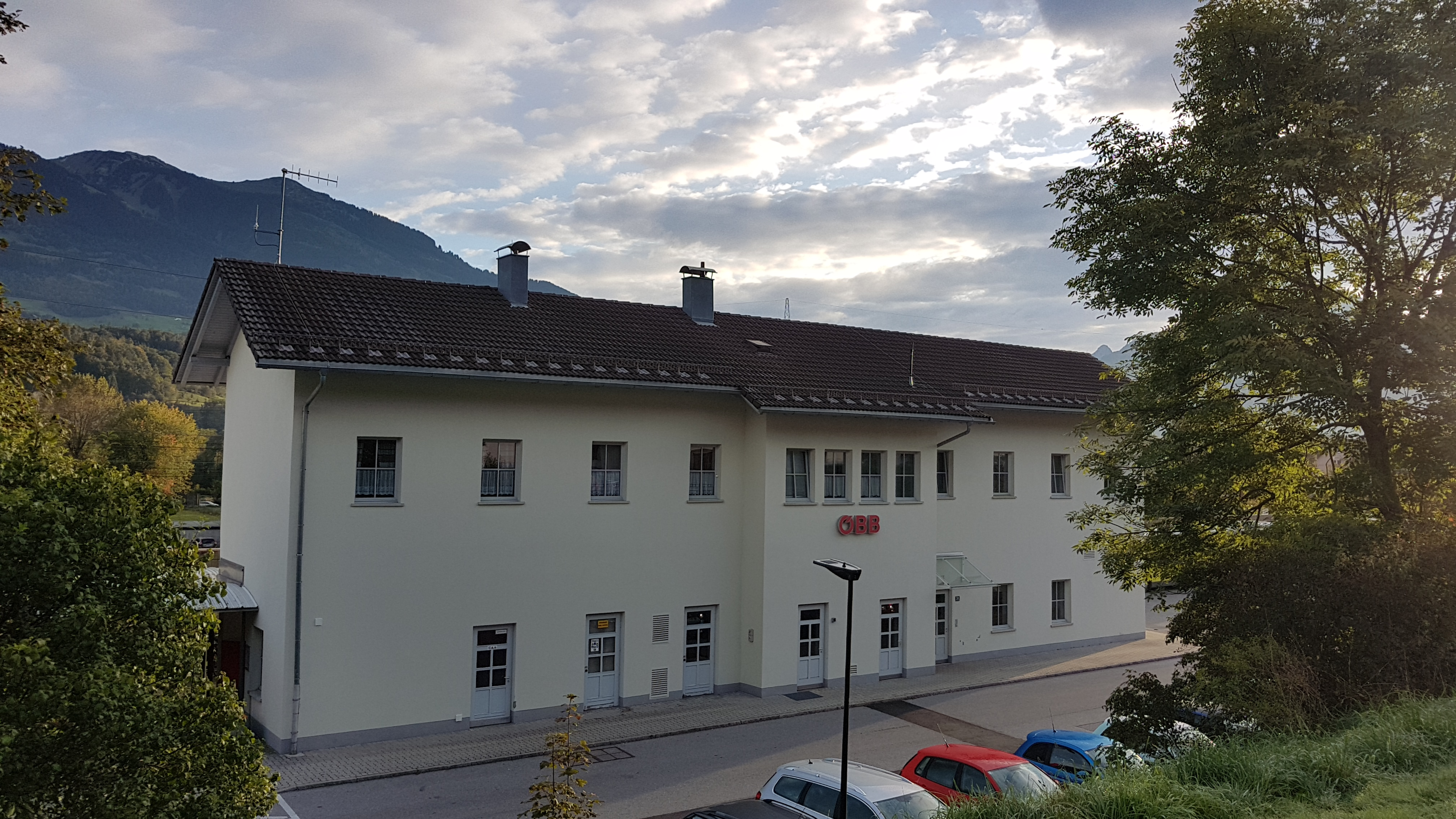
- Station building in 2019.

General information
- Location: Bahnhofstraße 58; 6710 Nenzing; Austria
- Coordinates: 47°11′27.7332″N 09°42′33.0552″E
- Elevation: 507 m (AA)
- Owner: Austrian Federal Railways (ÖBB)
- Operator: ÖBB
- Line: Vorarlberg railway

History
- Opened: 1 July 1872

Services
Preceding station	ÖBB	Following station
Bludenz Terminus	REX 1	Frastanz towards Lindau-Insel
Preceding station	Vorarlberg S-Bahn	Following station
Ludesch towards Bludenz	S1	Schlins-Beschling towards Lindau-Insel
Location
- Location within Austria Location within Vorarlberg

Nenzing railway station (German: Bahnhof Nenzing) is a railway station in Nenzing in the Bludenz district of the Austrian federal state of Vorarlberg. It was opened on 1 July 1872, together with the rest of the Vorarlberg railway. The station is owned and operated by the Austrian Federal Railways (ÖBB).

== Services ==
As of the December 2023 timetable change, the following regional train services call at Frastanz station (the S1 is also part of Bodensee S-Bahn):

- REX 1: trains between Bludenz and Lindau-Insel.
- Vorarlberg S-Bahn S1: half-hourly service between Bludenz and Bregenz Hafen, with some trains continuing to Lindau-Insel.

== See also ==
- Rail transport in Austria
