= Bludesch =

- Municipality
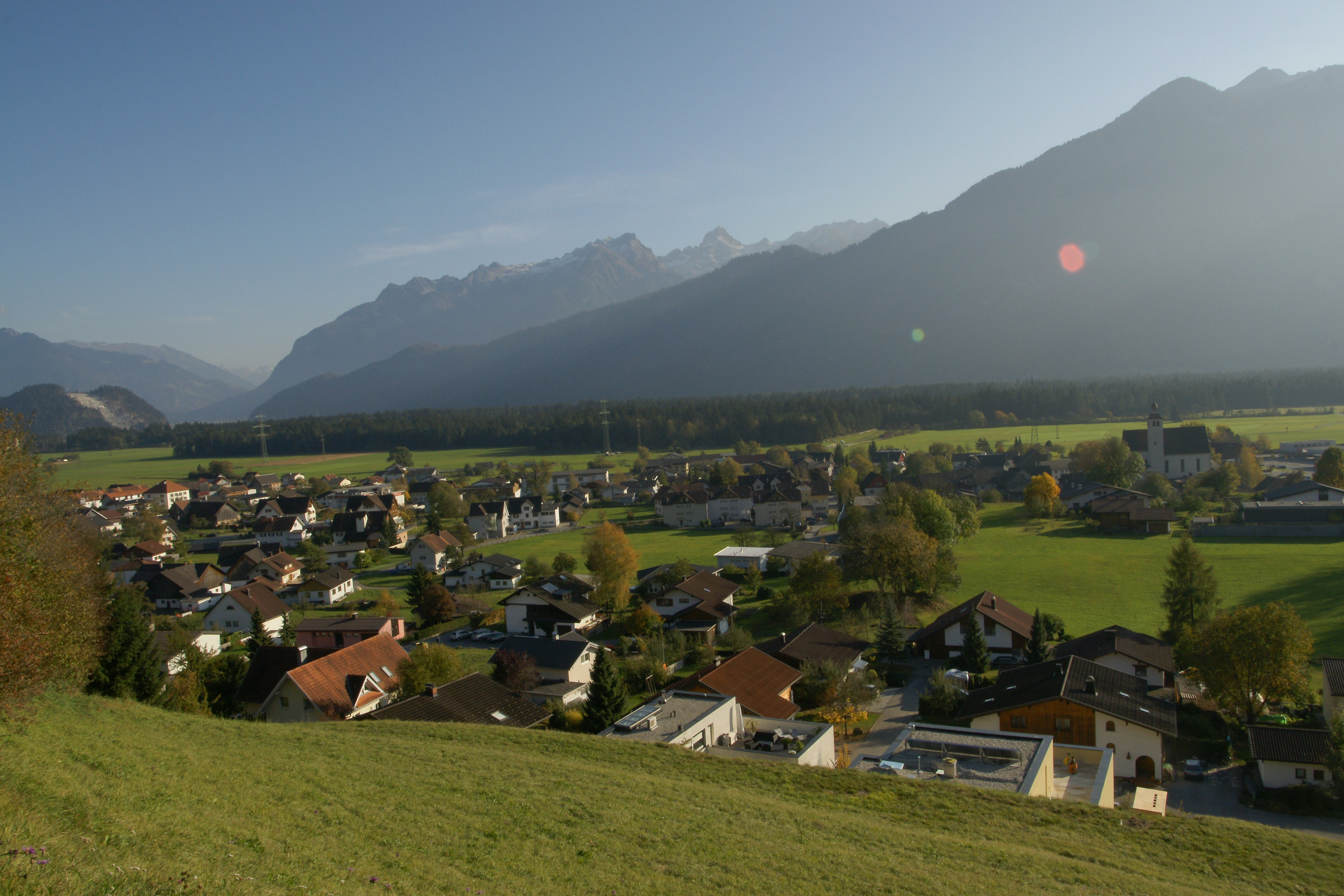

- Coat of arms

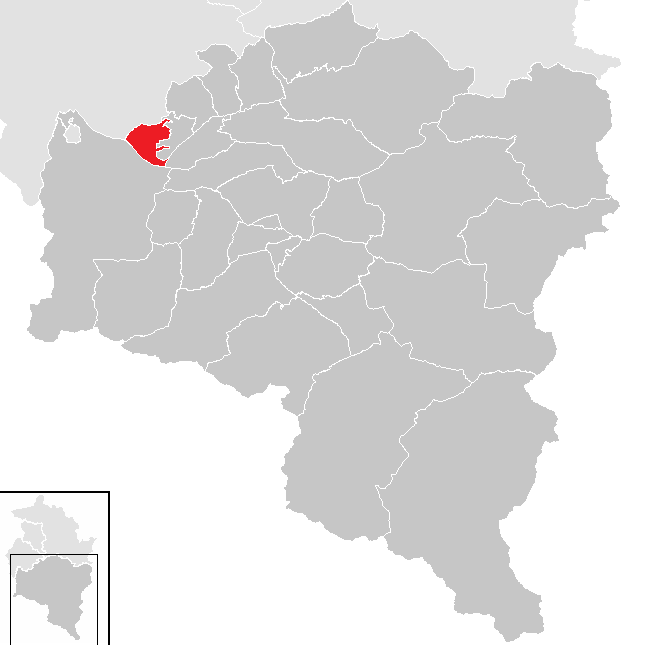
- Location in the district

- Location within Austria
- Coordinates: 47°12′00″N 09°44′00″E
- Country: Austria
- State: Vorarlberg
- District: Bludenz

Government
  - Mayor: Michael Tinkhauser (Wir in Bludesch/Gais)

Area
  - Total: 7.59 km^{2} (2.93 sq mi)
- Elevation: 529 m (1,736 ft)

Population (2018-12-31)
  - Total: 2,370
  - Density: 312/km^{2} (809/sq mi)
- Time zone: UTC+1 (CET)
  - Summer (DST): UTC+2 (CEST)
- Postal code: 6719
- Area code: 05550 and 05525
- Vehicle registration: BZ
- Website: www.bludesch.at

Bludesch is a municipality in the district of Bludenz in the Austrian state of Vorarlberg.

== Population ==
Historical population
Year	Pop.	±%
1869	470	—
1880	427	−9.1%
1890	459	+7.5%
1900	580	+26.4%
1910	492	−15.2%
1923	629	+27.8%
1934	599	−4.8%
1939	596	−0.5%
1951	631	+5.9%
1961	763	+20.9%
1971	961	+26.0%
1981	1,236	+28.6%
1991	1,539	+24.5%
2001	2,158	+40.2%
2011	2,279	+5.6%
