= Ludesch =

- Municipality
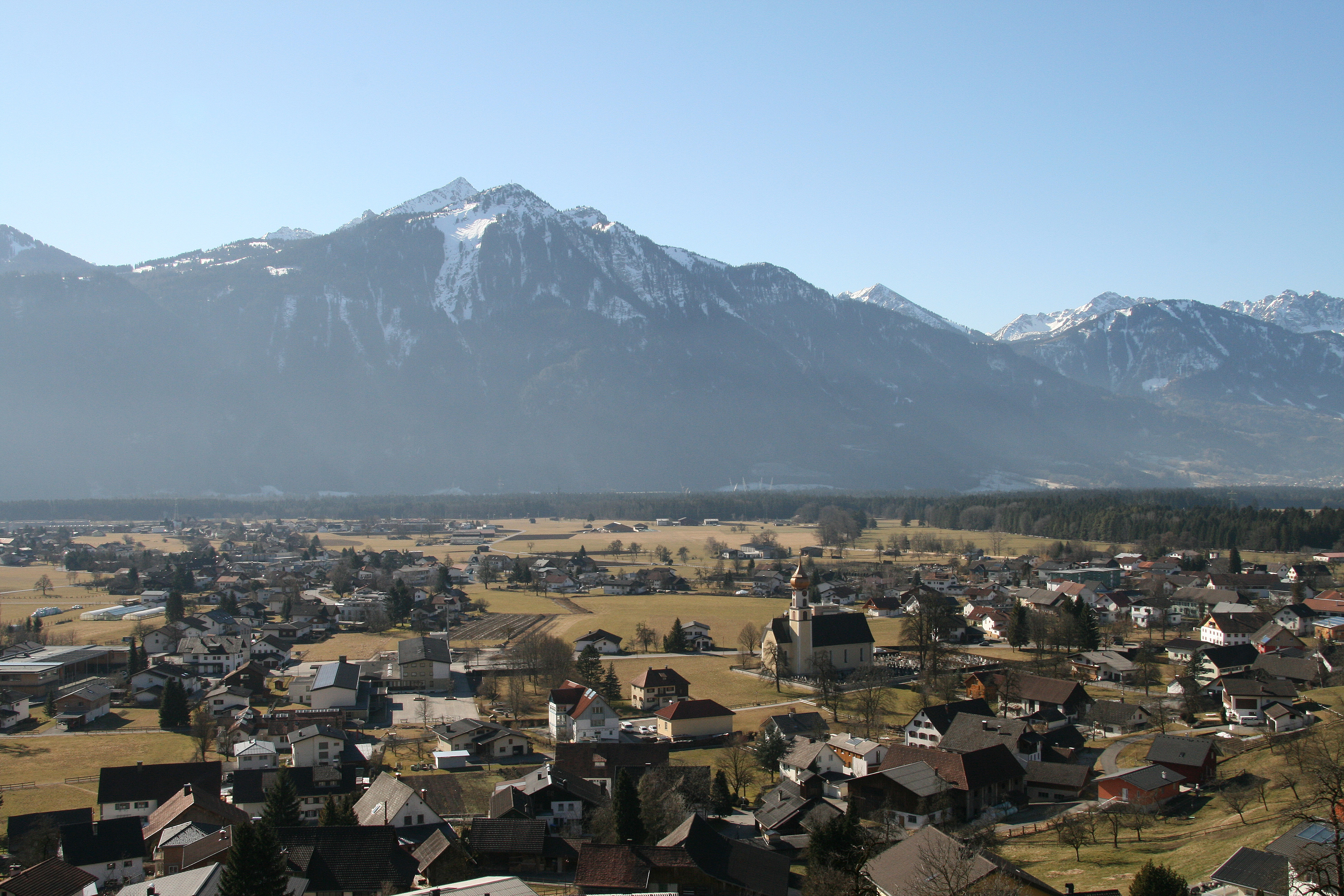

- Coat of arms

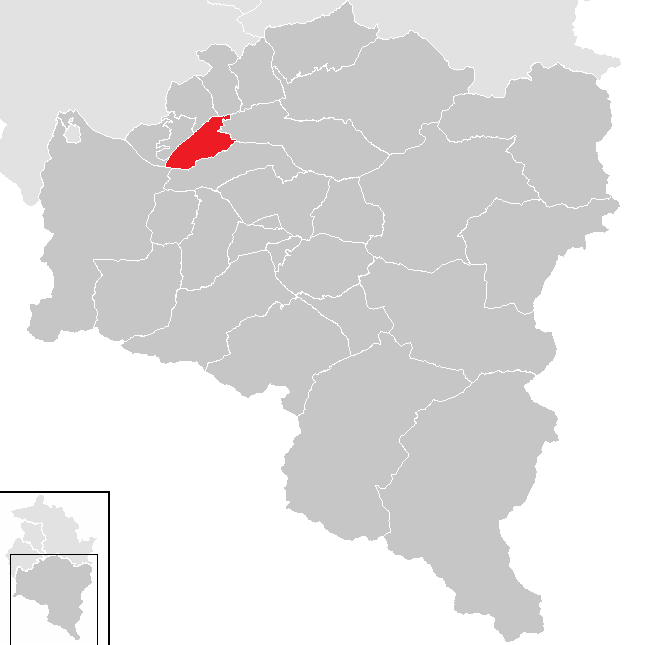
- Location in the district

- Location within Austria
- Coordinates: 47°12′00″N 09°46′00″E
- Country: Austria
- State: Vorarlberg
- District: Bludenz

Government
  - Mayor: Dieter Lauermann

Area
  - Total: 11.26 km^{2} (4.35 sq mi)
- Elevation: 555 m (1,821 ft)

Population (2018-01-01)
  - Total: 3,437
  - Density: 305.2/km^{2} (790.6/sq mi)
- Time zone: UTC+1 (CET)
  - Summer (DST): UTC+2 (CEST)
- Postal code: 6713
- Area code: 05550
- Vehicle registration: BZ
- Website: www.ludesch.at

Ludesch is a municipality in the district of Bludenz in the Austrian state of Vorarlberg.

== Population ==
Historical population
Year	Pop.	±%
1869	708	—
1880	765	+8.1%
1890	721	−5.8%
1900	733	+1.7%
1910	803	+9.5%
1923	816	+1.6%
1934	1,066	+30.6%
1939	1,075	+0.8%
1951	1,257	+16.9%
1961	1,408	+12.0%
1971	1,765	+25.4%
1981	2,146	+21.6%
1991	2,463	+14.8%
2001	2,805	+13.9%
2011	3,276	+16.8%

== Transport ==
Ludesch railway station is an intermediate station on the Vorarlberg railway line (Vorarlbergbahn) traversing Vorarlberg in a north-south direction. The railway station is called at by the S1 regional train service of Vorarlberg S-Bahn, operated by Austrian Federal Railways (ÖBB).
