= Sankt Anton im Montafon =

- Municipality
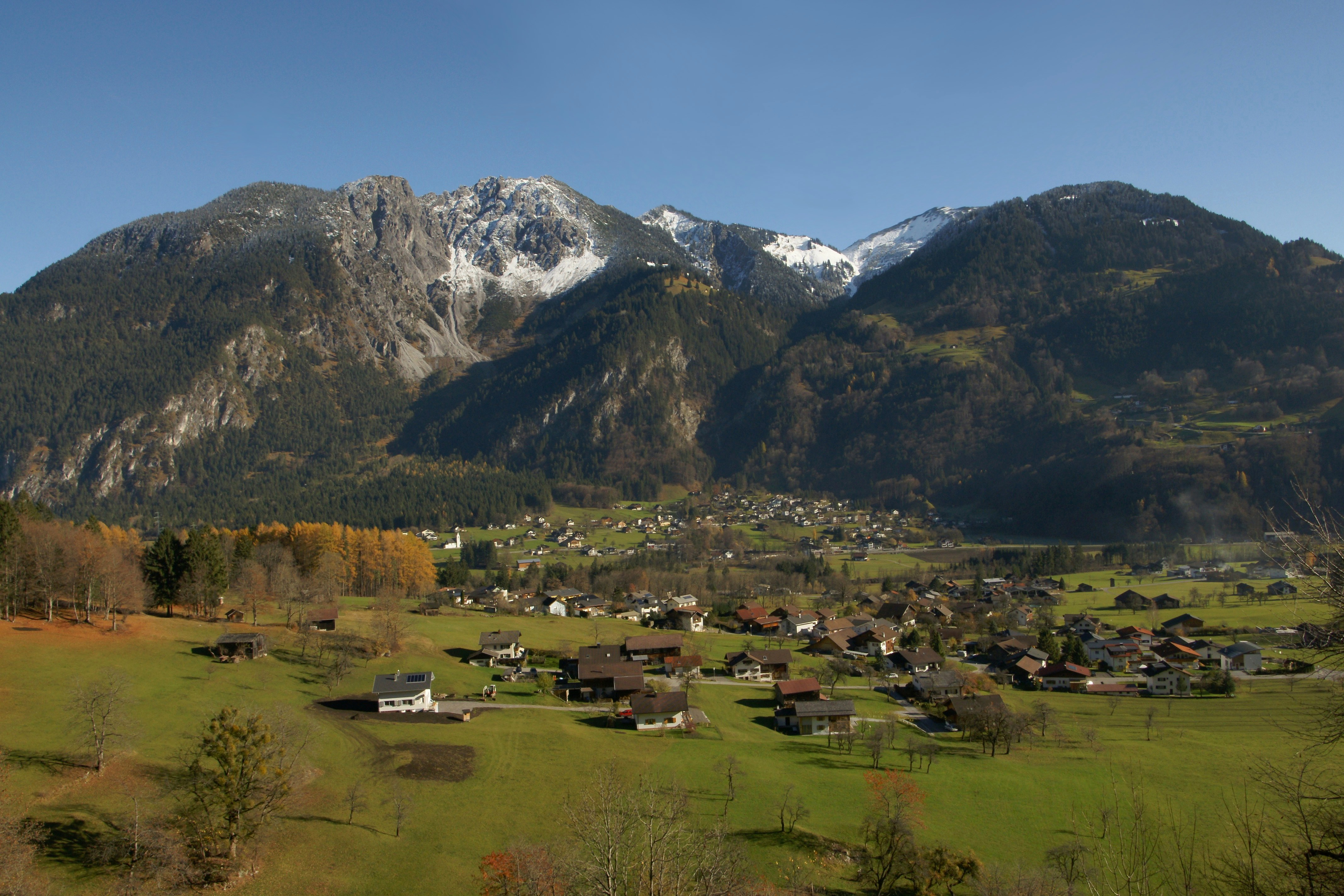

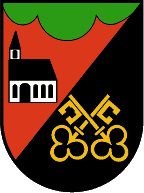
- Coat of arms

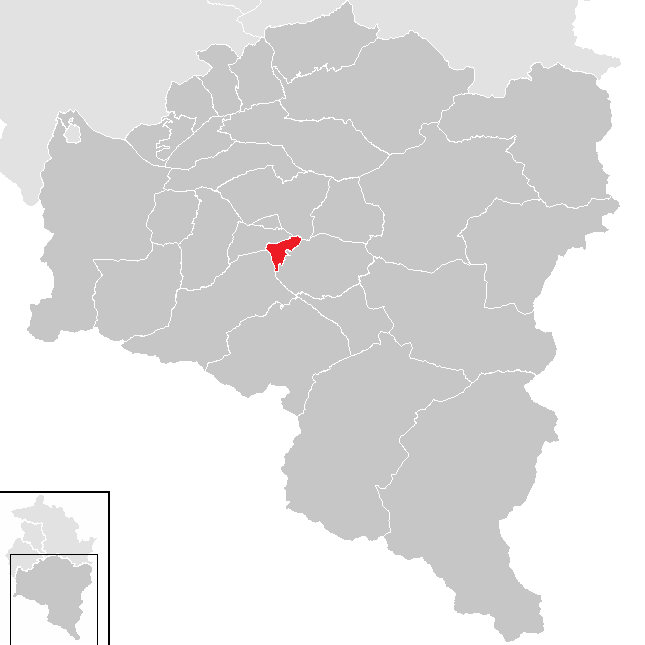
- Location in the district

- Location within Austria
- Coordinates: 47°07′00″N 09°52′00″E
- Country: Austria
- State: Vorarlberg
- District: Bludenz

Government
  - Mayor: Raimund Schuler (ÖVP)

Area
  - Total: 3.42 km^{2} (1.32 sq mi)
- Elevation: 651 m (2,136 ft)

Population (2018-01-01)
  - Total: 715
  - Density: 209/km^{2} (541/sq mi)
- Time zone: UTC+1 (CET)
  - Summer (DST): UTC+2 (CEST)
- Postal code: 6771
- Area code: 05552
- Vehicle registration: BZ
- Website: www.sankt-anton-im-montafon.at

Sankt Anton im Montafon is a town in the Montafon valley in the district of Bludenz in the Austrian state of Vorarlberg.

It is a popular ski resort, and much of the population makes a living from tourism.

== Population ==
Historical population
Year	Pop.	±%
1869	95	—
1880	119	+25.3%
1890	127	+6.7%
1900	153	+20.5%
1910	145	−5.2%
1923	146	+0.7%
1934	199	+36.3%
1939	195	−2.0%
1951	271	+39.0%
1961	346	+27.7%
1971	489	+41.3%
1981	580	+18.6%
1991	655	+12.9%
2001	699	+6.7%
2011	715	+2.3%

== Transport ==
St. Anton im Montafon is a railway station on the Bludenz–Schruns railway line of Montafonerbahn (mbs), which is served by the S4 service of Vorarlberg S-Bahn.
