= Gun law in Austria =

Austrian law allows firearm possession on shall-issue basis with certain classes of shotguns and rifles available without permit. With approximately 30 civilian firearms per 100 people, Austria is the 14th most armed country in the world.

== History ==
- 1853-1938 – Waffenpatent allows firearm ownership without permit for any non-prohibited person. Carry required permit which was being issued to respectable citizens.
- 1938-1945 – Nazi laws adds restrictions. Certain groups of people, including Jews, were prohibited from owning firearms.
- 1945-1967 – previous law largely remains in effect, right of Jews to bear arms is restored.
- 1967-1996 – new law regulating handguns goes into effect. It incl the right of the law-abiding citizens to own handguns.
- 1994 – pump-action shotguns are banned. A few hundred were turned in, 2,000 were registered and legalized and around 40,000 "disappeared" and went illegal.
- 1996 – today – Weapons Act is passed in accordance with EU law.

== Legal framework ==
In Austria the Waffengesetz (Weapons Act) defines weapons as objects that are designed to directly eliminate or reduce the ability of people to attack or defend themselves or for firing projectiles during hunting or sport shooting. §2 further defines firearms as weapons where projectiles can be fired from a barrel in a predefined direction.

== Firearm licensing ==
Austrian law divides firearms into three categories:

- Category C includes repeating, revolving and break-action rifles, break-action shotguns and projectile firing electroshock weapons;
- Category B includes handguns, repeating shotguns and semi-automatic rifles;
- Category A with its two subcategories:
  - war material includes automatic firearms, armor-piercing weapons, tanks;
  - restricted weapons includes weapons disguised as other objects, firearms which can be disassembled in a faster than usual fashion for hunting and sport, shotguns with an overall length of less than 90 cm (35 in) or barrel length shorter than 45 cm (18 in), pump action shotguns, suppressors and firearms with suppressors, knuckledusters, blackjacks, steel rods.

=== Category C ===
Any non-prohibited Austrian citizen, EU national with residence in Austria or a third-country national with permanent residence in Austria (with a special background check) over 18 can buy firearms from Category C without a permit after a three-day background check (people with a valid category B license or hunting permit are exempt). The law requires the owner to provide a good reason during the registration process. Good reasons according to law are: self-defense at home, hunting, sport shooting, and collecting. There is no limit on the number of Category C weapons that one can possess.

=== Category B ===
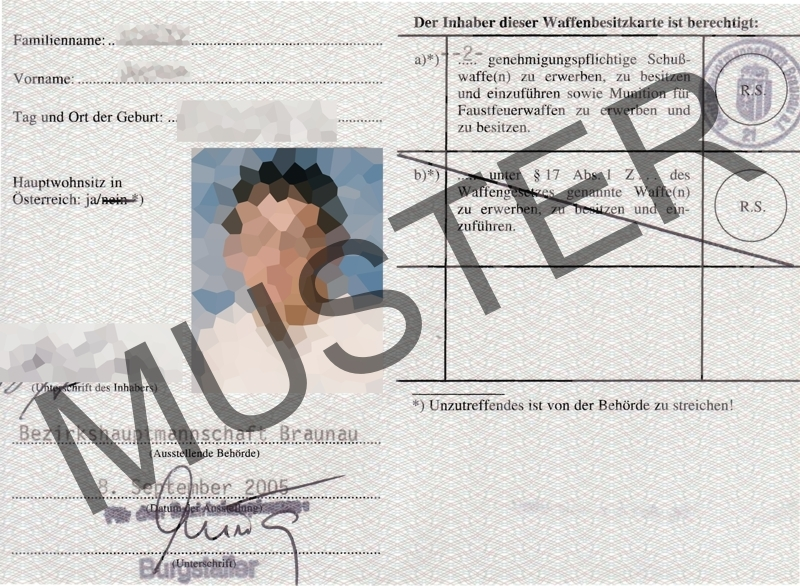
Austrian Waffenbesitzkarte

Acquisition of category B weapons requires a firearm license (Waffenbesitzkarte). Authorities shall issue licenses to any non-prohibited citizen of the European Economic Area over 21 who has a good reason (law stipulates self-defense at home as a good reason) allowing the purchase of up to two handguns. Authorities may issue a license to person below 21 but over 18, non-citizen of the EEA or a person seeking to own more than two handguns. Since 2019 the authorities shall issue a license for up to 5 category B weapons after a person is in possession of a license for two category B weapons for 5 or more years.

=== Category A ===
Category A weapons require further exceptions to be granted for holders, except in the case of suppressed weapons, which may be held by those with valid hunting licenses. War material like automatic firearms requires a further special federal permit, which is in practice only granted to approved collectors and experts.

=== Third-country nationals ===
Third-country nationals are eligible for a firearms license as long as they fulfil all the necessary requirements to obtain a Waffenbesitzkarte and have permanent residence (Daueraufenthaltstitel) in Austria. In the case of third-country nationals, the firearms permit is not issued on a shall-issue basis but on a still lenient may-issue basis. Furthermore, the permit will be issued for a limited time (1, 3 or 5 years) and will need to be renewed after expiry.

=== Private sale of firearms ===
The legal private sale of firearms in Austria is common practice. When selling privately, the persons are required to sign a sale agreement with details such as; legal names, residence address, serial number of the weapon, etc...

When category C weapons are purchased privately, these need to be registered at a gun store by showing the sale agreement within 6 weeks of purchase. No special cool-off / waiting period such as in the case with a purchase at a gun store exists in this case.

When category B and A weapons are purchased privately, the purchasing party is required to submit the sale agreement to their local authority. It is recommended that both parties provide their respective authorities with the sale agreement in a timely manner.

=== Expanding the license ===
The weapons license (Waffenbesitzkarte) can be expanded to over 2 category B weapons in the following cases:

- The person has been in possession of a license for 5 years. In which case they will receive a permit for 5 weapons of category B. Afterwards, they will receive an extra 2 category B places every 5 years.
- The person is a member of a recognised sport shooting club and participates regularly in competitions. In which case they will receive a permit for the amount of weapons that are justified for the use in their shooting disciplines.
- The person is a firearms collector who collects weapons for the reasons of cultural, historical, technical, scientific or other significant research and cultural preservation. In which case the person will receive a permit for the amount of weapons that are justified within their field of interest.
- Any other case is subject to a restrictive may-issue review process which usually results in a rejection due to the authorities wanting to avoid the build-up of civilian militia arsenals.

== Carrying firearms ==
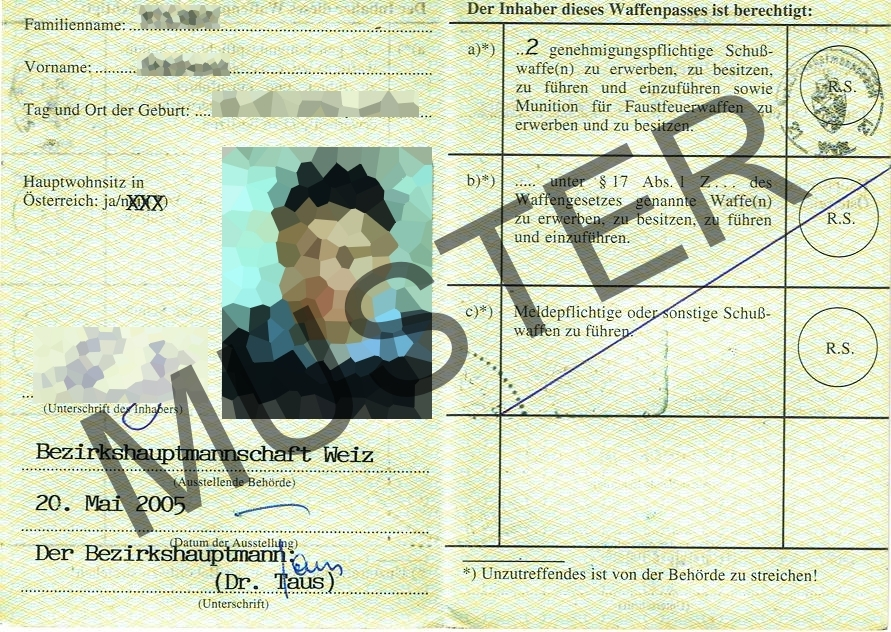
Austrian Waffenpass

Carrying firearms in public generally requires a carry permit (or "Waffenpass"). Carry permits are issued by the authorities on a shall issue or may issue basis, depending on reason and applicant. General self-protection concerns are not sufficient to obtain a Waffenpass; the applicant must demonstrate that they are exposed to particular dangers that can most effectively be countered with a firearm. It is not necessary to have an additional firearm license as the Austrian carry permit includes all the rights of a firearms license with the addition of the right to carry those firearms. Austrian law makes no distinction between concealed or open carry; with a carry permit, the holder may carry their weapon(s) freely throughout the whole country and even in certain "weapon free zones". However, holders must carry their weapons in a way that does not constitute a public nuisance; for example, openly displaying a handgun in one's belt at the cinema while wearing civilian clothing would be considered unusual and could be considered a public nuisance if the police were called.

== Storing firearms ==
Firearms and ammunition have to be stored securely in a reasonable manner to prevent unauthorized access. There are no general storage requirements for firearms and ammunition inside someones own residence, and each gun owner is responsible for keeping his firearms and ammunition stored securely. As self defense is a recognized reason by the law to own firearms, keeping firearms stored in loaded condition inside someones own habitation is allowed. However, if someone has 20 or more firearms stored in a close area or a large quantity of ammunition (more than 5,000 rounds) they must inform the appropriate authorities of the measures they have taken to ensure safe storage and protection against unauthorized access (for example a gun safe). Such a notification is required again when the number of firearms stored in a close area has doubled since the last communication to the Authority.

== Firearm possession ==
As of 2019 there are 1,068,582 (or 12 per 100 people) registered firearms in Austria owned by 320,352 people (6.5% of population). 198,834 of them have Category B firearm license and 74,527 people (0.8% of population) have carry permit. 75,526 people (0.8% of population) are prohibited from owning firearms Small Arms Survey estimates that there are approximately 1,740,000 unregistered and illegal firearms in Austria.

== Controversies ==
After the Graz school shooting in June 2025, Austrian gun laws were heavily criticized as some of the most relaxed in Europe. On the following Monday, the Austrian chancellor, Christian Stocker, vowed to tighten gun laws. Three months later, in September 2025, the National Council passed a tightened gun law, including higher minimum ages and stricter psychological screening requirements.

== See also ==
- Gun laws by nation
