= Frastanz =

- Municipality
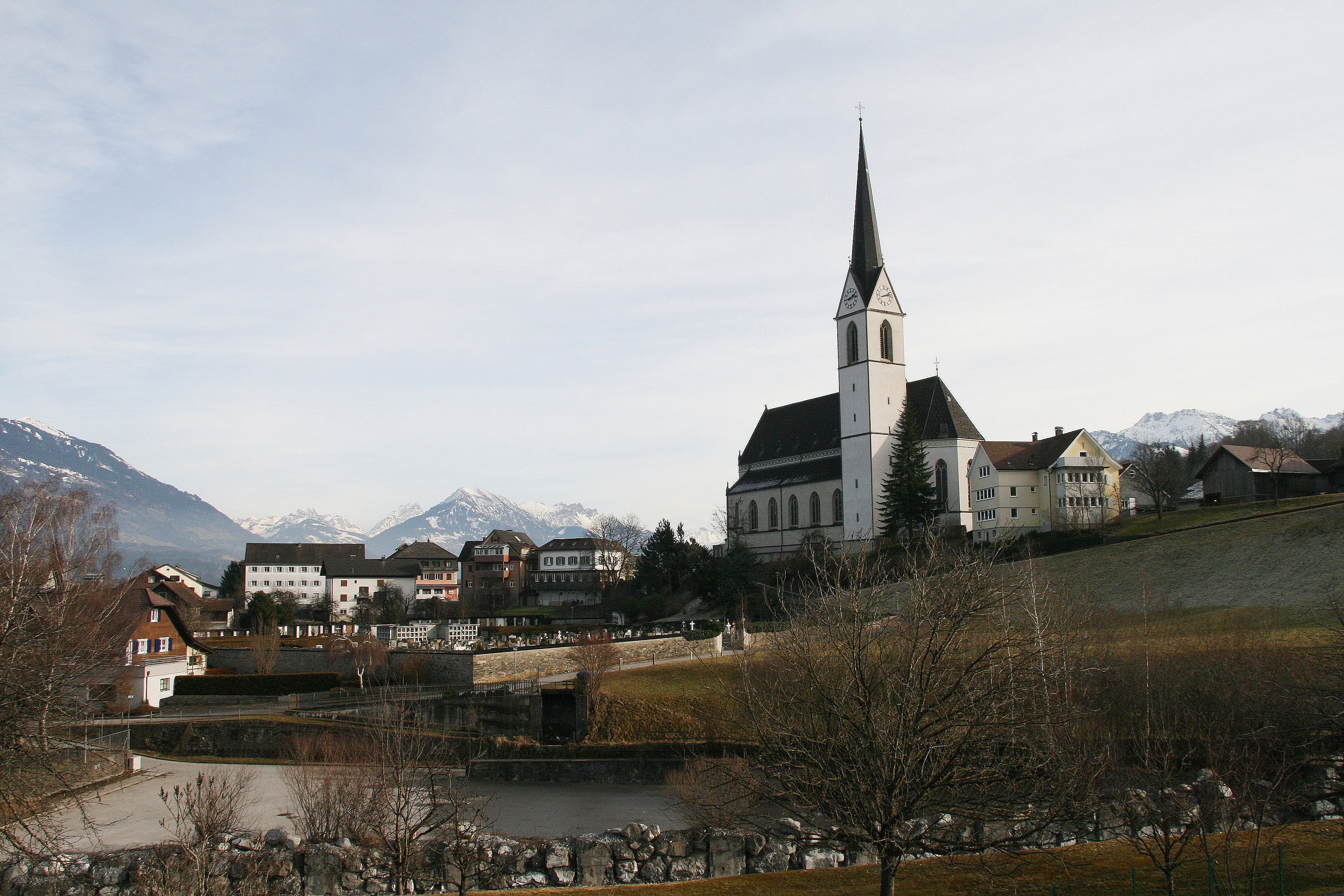
- View of the town

- Coat of arms

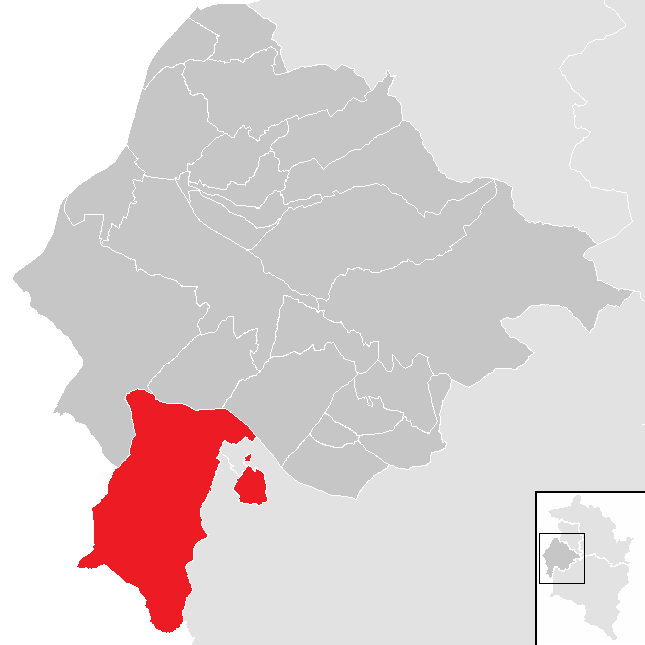
- Location in the district

- Location within Austria
- Coordinates: 47°13′12″N 09°37′12″E
- Country: Austria
- State: Vorarlberg
- District: Feldkirch

Government
  - Mayor: Walter Gohm

Area
  - Total: 32.3 km^{2} (12.5 sq mi)
- Elevation: 510 m (1,670 ft)

Population (2018-01-01)
  - Total: 6,434
  - Density: 199/km^{2} (516/sq mi)
- Time zone: UTC+1 (CET)
  - Summer (DST): UTC+2 (CEST)
- Postal code: 6820
- Area code: 05522
- Vehicle registration: FK
- Website: www.frastanz.at

Frastanz is a market town in the district of Feldkirch in the westernmost Austrian state of Vorarlberg. In former times it was known for its production of tobacco.

== Geography ==
Frastanz is located 510 meters above sea level. It is 32.25 km^{2} in area. 61.2% of the area are wooded.

== History ==
In ancient times, Frastanz was situated on a Roman Road. It was also the site of the Battle of Frastanz in 1499.

== Population ==
Historical population
Year	Pop.	±%
1869	1,664	—
1880	1,580	−5.0%
1890	1,814	+14.8%
1900	2,021	+11.4%
1910	2,364	+17.0%
1923	2,111	−10.7%
1934	2,572	+21.8%
1939	2,836	+10.3%
1951	3,530	+24.5%
1961	4,221	+19.6%
1971	5,174	+22.6%
1981	5,413	+4.6%
1991	5,881	+8.6%
2001	6,214	+5.7%
2011	6,153	−1.0%

== Transport ==
Frastanz railway station is on the main west–east route connecting the Vorarlberg railway line (Vorarlbergbahn) in the directions of Bregenz and Bludenz, continuing eastward over the Arlberg Railway line to Innsbruck and beyond. The train system is operated by the Austrian Federal Railways (ÖBB), including regional train services of Vorarlberg S-Bahn.

== Politics ==
The local council consists of 27 members, with representatives of five political parties: The Austrian People's Party, the Green Party, the Freedom Party of Austria, the Social Democratic Party of Austria, and the Free Citizens' List. The current mayor is Walter Gohm.
