= Frastanz railway station =

Railway station in Vorarlberg, Austria

Frastanz
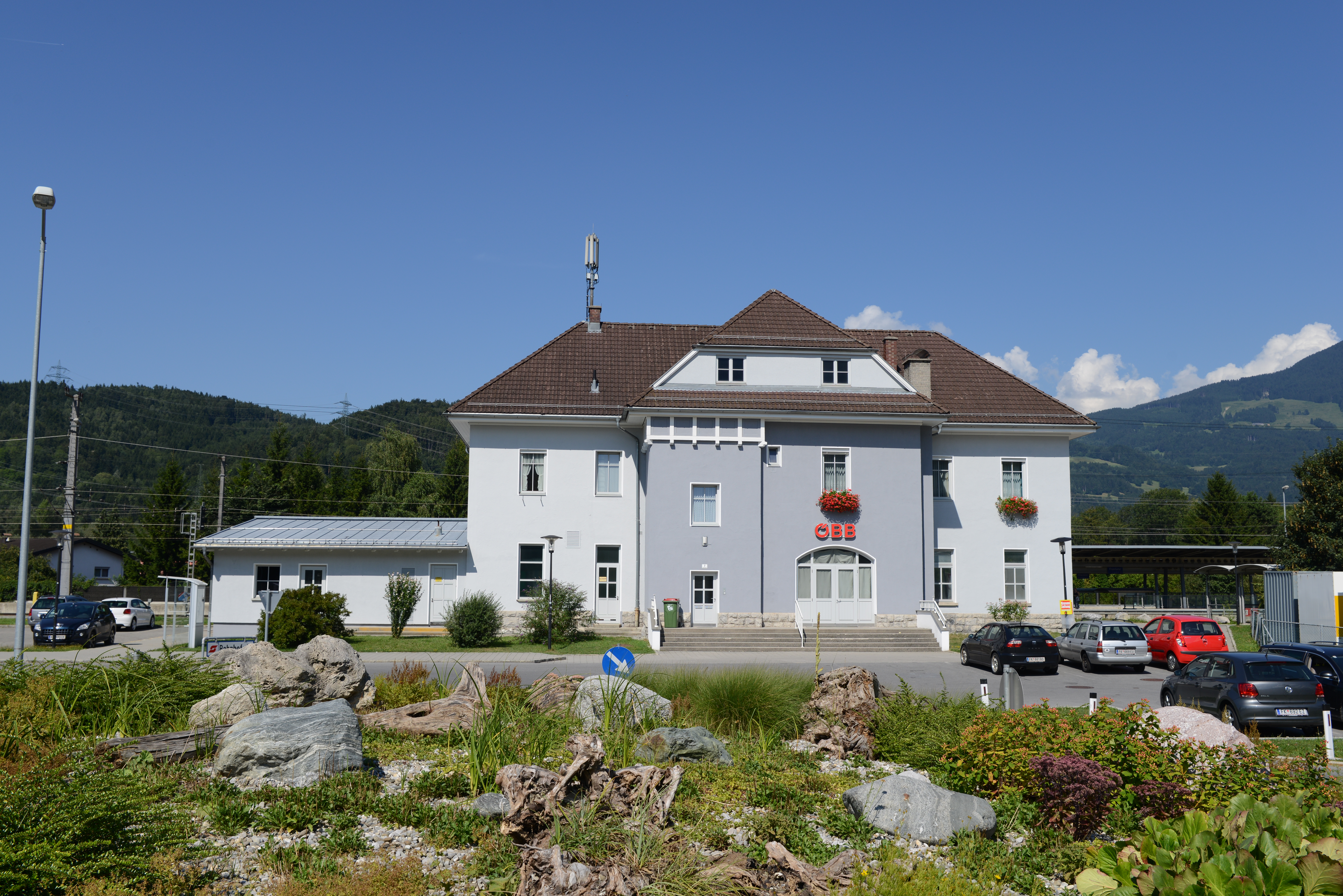
- Station building in 2013.

General information
- Location: Sonnenberger Straße; 6820 Frastanz; Austria
- Coordinates: 47°13′11.4996″N 09°38′19.1796″E
- Elevation: 472 m (AA)
- Owner: Austrian Federal Railways (ÖBB)
- Operator: ÖBB
- Line: Vorarlberg railway

History
- Opened: 1 July 1872

Services
Preceding station	ÖBB	Following station
Nenzing towards Bludenz	REX 1	Feldkirch towards Lindau-Insel
Preceding station		Following station
Bludenz toward Wien Westbahnhof	WESTbahn	Feldkirch toward Lindau-Insel
Preceding station	Vorarlberg S-Bahn	Following station
Schlins-Beschling towards Bludenz	S1	Feldkirch towards Lindau-Insel
Location
- Location within Austria Location within Vorarlberg

Frastanz railway station (German: Bahnhof Frastanz) is a railway station in Frastanz in the Feldkirch district of the Austrian federal state of Vorarlberg. It was opened on 1 July 1872, together with the rest of the Vorarlberg railway. The station is owned and operated by the Austrian Federal Railways (ÖBB).

== Services ==
As of the December 2024 timetable change, the following regional train services call at Frastanz station (the S1 is also part of Bodensee S-Bahn):

- WESTbahn green: one train per day and direction to Lindau-Insel and Wien Westbahnhof.
- REX 1: trains between Bludenz and Lindau-Insel.
- Vorarlberg S-Bahn S1: half-hourly service between Bludenz and Bregenz Hafen, with some trains continuing to Lindau-Insel.

== See also ==
- Rail transport in Austria
