= Dalaas =

- Municipality
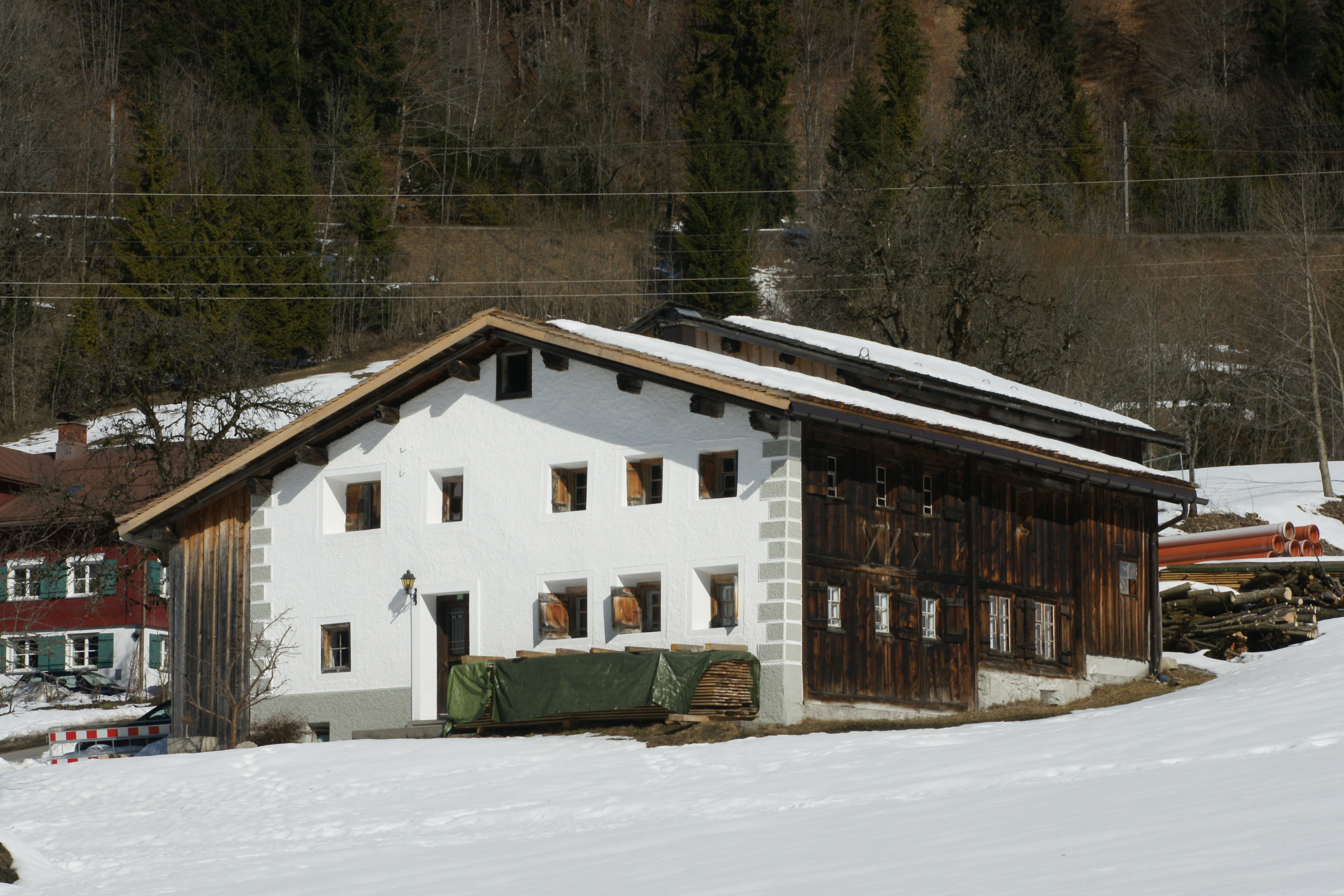

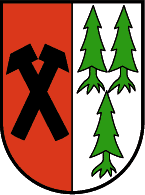
- Coat of arms

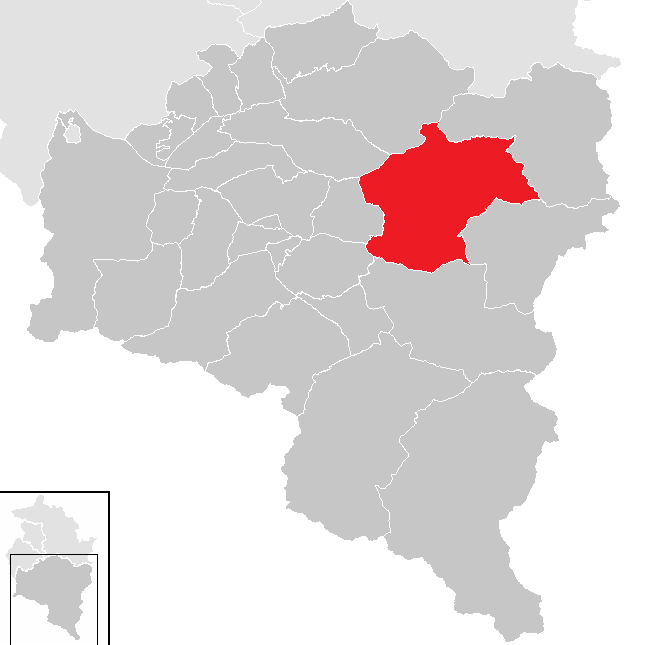
- Location in the district

- Location within Austria
- Coordinates: 47°07′00″N 09°58′00″E
- Country: Austria
- State: Vorarlberg
- District: Bludenz

Government
  - Mayor: Christian Gantner (ÖVP)

Area
  - Total: 94.3 km^{2} (36.4 sq mi)
- Elevation: 835 m (2,740 ft)

Population (2018-01-01)
  - Total: 1,597
  - Density: 16.9/km^{2} (43.9/sq mi)
- Time zone: UTC+1 (CET)
  - Summer (DST): UTC+2 (CEST)
- Postal code: 6752
- Area code: 05585
- Vehicle registration: BZ
- Website: www.dalaas.at

Dalaas is a municipality in the district of Bludenz in the Austrian state of Vorarlberg.

== Population ==
Historical population
Year	Pop.	±%
1869	838	—
1880	814	−2.9%
1890	865	+6.3%
1900	911	+5.3%
1910	943	+3.5%
1923	1,620	+71.8%
1934	1,162	−28.3%
1939	1,106	−4.8%
1951	1,508	+36.3%
1961	1,507	−0.1%
1971	1,490	−1.1%
1981	1,477	−0.9%
1991	1,580	+7.0%
2001	1,549	−2.0%
2011	1,513	−2.3%

== Mayor ==
Since 2005 Christian Gantner (* 1980) is the mayor.

== Transport ==
Dalaas is located along an expressway, the Arlberg Schnellstraße (S16), between Bludenz and Zams (Tyrol).

Dalaas and Wald am Arlberg are two defunct railway stations on the Arlberg Railway line (Bludenz–Innsbruck Hauptbahnhof).

== See also ==
- Horizon Field
