= Innerbraz =

- Municipality
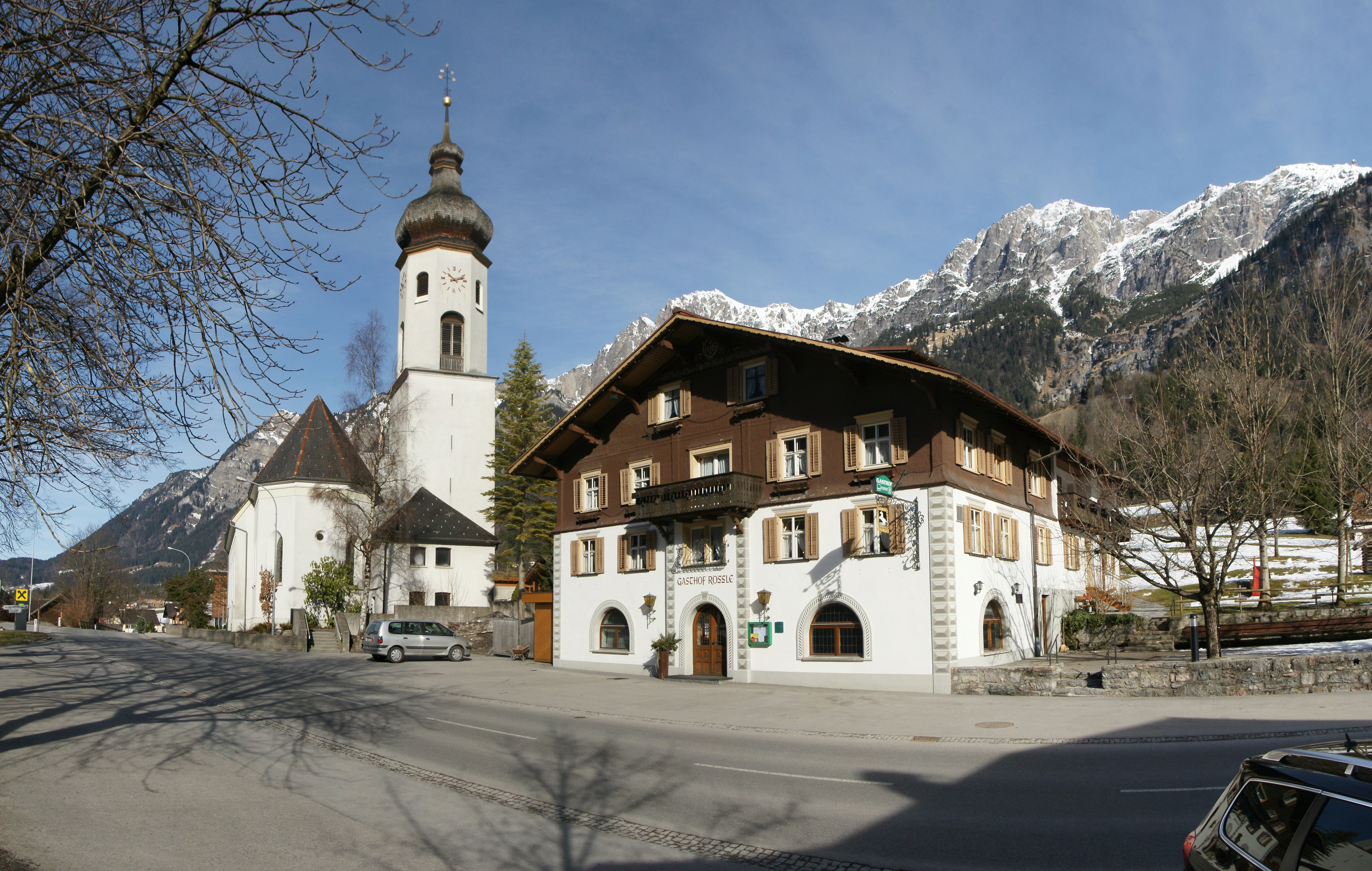

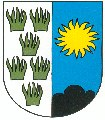
- Coat of arms

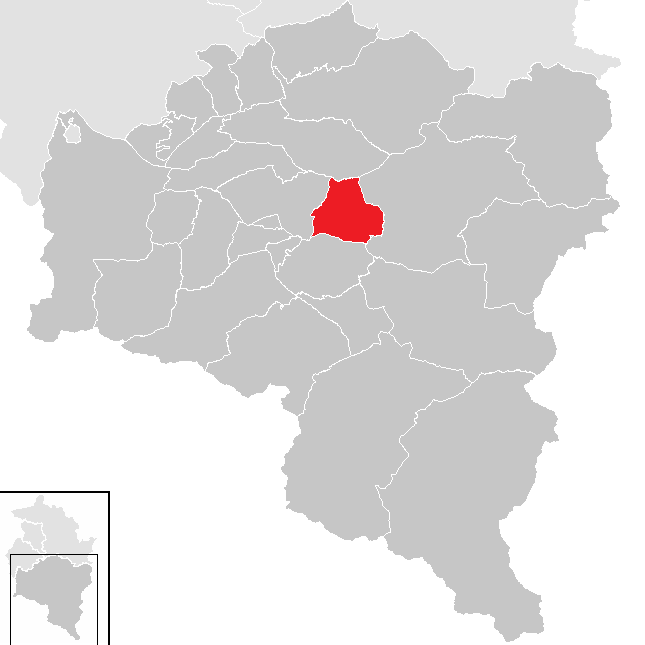
- Location in the district

- Location within Austria
- Coordinates: 47°08′00″N 09°55′00″E
- Country: Austria
- State: Vorarlberg
- District: Bludenz

Government
  - Mayor: Hans Peter Pfanner

Area
  - Total: 19.97 km^{2} (7.71 sq mi)
- Elevation: 708 m (2,323 ft)

Population (2018-01-01)
  - Total: 994
  - Density: 49.8/km^{2} (129/sq mi)
- Time zone: UTC+1 (CET)
  - Summer (DST): UTC+2 (CEST)
- Postal code: 6751
- Area code: 05552
- Vehicle registration: BZ
- Website: www.innerbraz.at

Innerbraz is a municipality in the district of Bludenz in the Austrian state of Vorarlberg.

== Population ==
Historical population
Year	Pop.	±%
1869	438	—
1880	383	−12.6%
1890	443	+15.7%
1900	464	+4.7%
1910	508	+9.5%
1923	501	−1.4%
1934	465	−7.2%
1939	478	+2.8%
1951	722	+51.0%
1961	726	+0.6%
1971	810	+11.6%
1981	844	+4.2%
1991	930	+10.2%
2001	975	+4.8%
2011	950	−2.6%

== Transport ==
The municipality is located along an expressway, the Arlberg Schnellstraße (S16), between Bludenz and Zams (Tyrol).

Braz and Hintergasse are two defunct railway stations on the Arlberg Railway line (Bludenz–Innsbruck Hauptbahnhof).
