= 2025 Graz school shooting =

2025 mass shooting in Styria, Austria

Graz school shooting
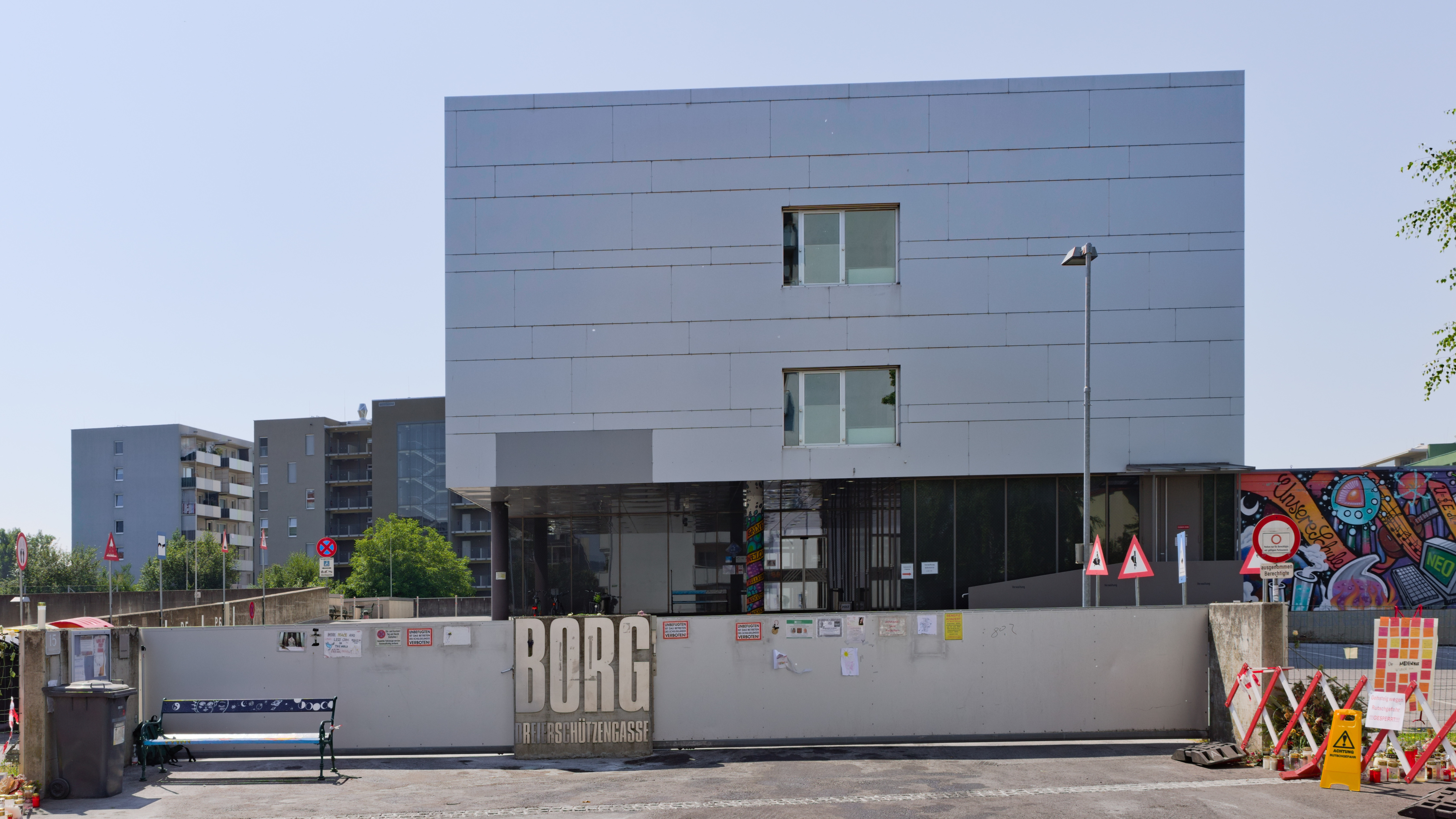
- Main entrance to the school where the shooting took place
- Native name: Amoklauf in Graz 2025
- Location: 47°04′40″N 15°24′38″E; Bundes-Oberstufenrealgymnasium Dreierschützengasse; Graz, Styria, Austria
- Date: 10 June 2025; 17 months ago 09:57 – 10:07 (CEST, UTC+02:00)
- Target: Students and school staff
- Attack type: School shooting; mass shooting; mass murder; murder-suicide
- Weapons: 9mm Glock 19 Gen2 semi-automatic pistol; 12-gauge Mercury Sport O/U Tactical double-barrelled shotgun; Hunting knife (unused)
- Deaths: 11 (including the perpetrator)
- Injuries: 30+ (11 from gunfire)
- Perpetrator: Arthur A. (Note: The full name of the perpetrator has not been released officially.)
- Motive: Personal glorification of school shootings (copycat crime)

On 10 June 2025, at 09:57 CEST, a mass shooting occurred at the Dreierschützengasse secondary school in Graz, Austria. The shooter killed 10 people and injured 11 others. The gunman died of a self-inflicted gunshot wound in the school lavatory and was identified as a 21-year-old former student at the school.

The shooting was the deadliest rampage killing in modern Austrian history.

== Background ==
BORG Dreierschützengasse is an upper secondary gymnasium (Bundesoberstufenrealgymnasium) in Graz's Lend district. At the time, between 350 and 400 people were inside the building, where oral exams for Matura were being held.

== Incident ==
=== Shooting ===
At around 09:43, the perpetrator entered BORG Dreierschützengasse. The gunman entered a restroom on the third floor, where he armed himself with a pistol and sawed-off shotgun he had carried inside in a backpack and put on a pair of shooting glasses, a headset, and a weapons-belt with a hunting knife. The first gunshots were fired at 09:57 in a fifth-grade classroom on the second floor. Afterwards, the perpetrator returned to the third floor, where he opened fire inside a seventh-grade classroom after shooting several times at the lock to open the door. At 10:04, he called his mother. At 10:07, he returned to the school lavatory on the same floor, where he shot himself using the handgun inside a toilet cubicle. The shooting lasted seven minutes, during which around 40 gunshots were fired in total.

=== Emergency response ===
Emergency services arrived within six minutes of the call at 10:06. Police dispatched a total of 300 officers, including regular units, the tactical force Einsatzkommando Cobra, and 160 paramedics and firefighters. All deceased, including the perpetrator, were accounted for at 10:13. The school building was evacuated within 17 minutes after the arrival of first responders and the situation was reported to be under control by 10:28. A disaster alert was issued for nearby hospitals.

== Victims ==
The dead included nine students and one teacher (who later died at a hospital). Seven of the victims were female (including the teacher that was killed) and three were male. The nine dead students were aged 14 to 17. Graz mayor Elke Kahr confirmed that the perpetrator was among the dead. One person had been killed outside of the school building according to Kleine Zeitung, though it wasn't confirmed by authorities.

A total of thirty people were treated at hospitals around Graz, of whom twelve had gunshot wounds. The nearby Helmut-List-Halle was repurposed as an emergency triage centre for the injured. Five people were described as being in critical condition, while two adults were in life-threatening condition. A 59-year-old teacher died at Universitätsklinikum Graz eight hours later. By the following day, the remaining injured, aged 15 to 27, were all in stable condition.

Nine of the deceased victims were Austrian nationals, including one with dual French citizenship, while one was a Polish national. Two of the deceased and one injured victim were of Bosnian descent, and one of the students killed was of Kosovo Albanian descent. Two of the injured were Romanian nationals, while a third was an Iranian citizen.

== Perpetrator ==
The perpetrator was identified as Arthur A., a 21-year-old Austrian citizen from Kalsdorf bei Graz who formerly attended the school. He had to repeat the sixth grade and dropped out without graduating in 2022. Part of the shooting took place in his former classroom. His mother has Austrian citizenship and his father is Armenian. He was unemployed and had been rejected from service in the Austrian Armed Forces after being judged "mentally unfit". He was living in an apartment with his mother at the time of the shooting.

The perpetrator legally owned both firearms used in the shooting through a firearms ownership card (Waffenbesitzkarte) he had obtained in April 2025, but did not have a firearms carrying licence (Waffenpass). The Glock semi-automatic pistol was purchased in May, a few days before the shooting, while the shotgun had been in his possession since April. He had no prior criminal record.

=== Motive ===
Shortly after the shooting, media reports erroneously reported that the perpetrator described himself as "a victim of bullying", citing "unconfirmed reports" by Kronen Zeitung, which speculated that the shooting was motivated by revenge. ORF reporter Peter Unger stated that the claim originated from social media and was not verified by police. The perpetrator was acquainted with one killed female student, who was his upstairs neighbour, and the deceased teacher. Interior Minister Gerhard Karner stated that the police investigation was ongoing and that details about the motive were "speculative".

A suicide note was found by police during a search of the suspect's residence the same afternoon, but its contents were not immediately released. In their coverage, Kronen Zeitung reported that there was mention of bullying in the letter, which other press agencies described as unconfirmed. Director General for Public Security Franz Ruf stated that the note was a goodbye message addressed to his parents and contained no reason for the shooting. Also discovered was a non-functional pipe bomb, as well as a video message sent to the perpetrator's mother before the shooting. According to media reports, no motive was given in the video, which consisted solely of the perpetrator declaring his intention to carry out the attack on his old school and the assurance that he was acting out of "free volition". The perpetrator's mother viewed the footage 24 minutes after it was uploaded and immediately contacted the police, by which point the shooting had already started.

Further documents found indicated that the perpetrator had planned a bombing attack, but discarded the idea, and also showed that the perpetrator had specifically targeted the second and third floor of the school. A social media account linked to the perpetrator had posted images of the weapons used in the shooting, as well as photos of Eric Harris and Dylan Klebold, the perpetrators of the 1999 Columbine High School massacre, whose images he also used as profile pictures. Austria's Federal Police described the perpetrator as having had "a significant interest" in school shootings for several years. ORF also linked the shooting to the True Crime Community, based on the perpetrator's fascination with prior mass shootings. In May 2026, the public prosecutor's office of Graz concluded their investigations, announcing that there were no hints to co-conspirators and that the shooting was a copycat crime committed in "glorification of school shootings".

== Aftermath ==
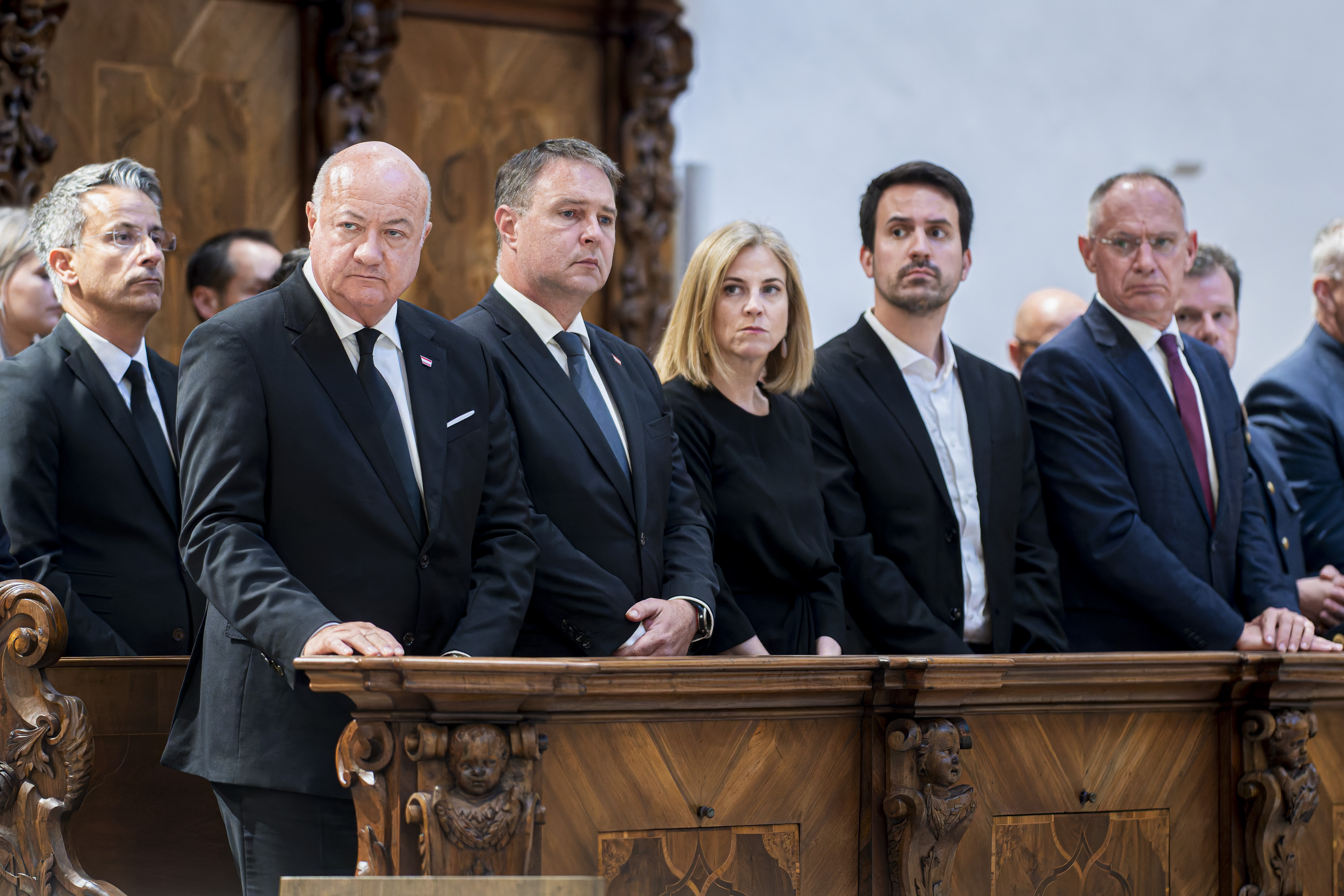
Christian Stocker, Andreas Babler, Beate Meinl-Reisinger, Christoph Wiederkehr and Gerhard Karner at the memorial service in the Graz Cathedral on the evening of 10 June

A service for the victims was held at Graz Cathedral on the evening of 10 June, while a makeshift memorial was erected in front of the city hall. A nationwide minute of silence for the victims was held on 11 June.

The perpetrator's name was initially reported as "Artur A.", due to which photos of an unrelated man from Styria with the same name, similar age and shared Armenian heritage, were shared online following publication on a French internet platform. An online hate campaign against him and his family developed, leading him to call the Austrian broadcaster ORF for help.

There was criticism directed at Kronen Zeitung and Oe24 for publishing unverified information about the shooting and making sensationalist reports. Die Furche newspaper suggested that media should take more care in their reports by focusing less on the perpetrator and write "considerate" of the victims, as well as avoid simplified early motive speculation.

Misinformation and conspiracy theories were spread by some right-wing media such as Exxpress and AUF1, including that the shooting was committed by an immigrant and part of a "globalist agenda". After the perpetrator was identified as having an Armenian father, it was also falsely claimed that the perpetrator was originally from Armenia and had only obtained Austrian citizenship later in life. AUF1 founder Stefan Magnet blamed mass migration, Austria's "degenerated society", as well as "media, Hollywood, Netflix, Amazon" for the shooting. Michael Scharfmüller, editor-in-chief of Info-DIREKT magazine, and Florian Machl, founder of Report24, argued that the shooter had felt threatened by the "over-foreignization" ("Überfremdung") of the student body.

While the shooting was still ongoing, FPÖ politician Thomas Dim made a Facebook post stating "I'll repeat myself: A country without deportations is a country without protection" along with an image of a news report on the Graz shooting. Der Standard and Oberösterreichische Nachrichten reported that Dim had made the post under the belief that the shooter was an immigrant and later changed the post to "Horrifying!" before it was deleted entirely. Dim subsequently claimed that the post had been "a photo manipulation" before later stating that the post had been "made by an employee without his consultation".

On 23 June, the school re-opened for the final two weeks of the school year, but the affected areas from the shooting will be closed and re-designed during the nine weeks of summer vacation. Attendance was optional for students during the final two weeks and lessons could also be held outside the school in container rooms, while psychological counselling continued in the nearby List Hall. In February 2026, the school was closed down for extensive renovations, in part to rebuild the classrooms where the shootings took place into a commemorative loggia and multifaith space. Construction was set to finish in August 2026. State control over the school is expected to be returned in winter 2027.

On 8 June 2026, as part of the one-year anniversary, ORF aired the documentary Amoklauf in Graz – das Leben danach (Amok in Graz – The Life After), which deals with the aftermath of the shooting for the affected school and families. At the request of surviving victims and their families, no public commemoration was held and a small memorial service was instead held the day before the anniversary on 9 June at the City Hall of Graz.

=== Related criminal offences ===
On 11 June, a number of bomb threat e-mails were sent to various schools and train stations in Austria, including another secondary school in Graz and a kindergarten, leading to police being dispatched for security. Similar threatening messages had preceded the shooting and a potential attempt at copycat crime is being investigated. On 12 June, three schools in Stainz were evacuated due to attack threats. At least 30 false alarms related to school attack threats were recorded in Graz by 17 June. A 19-year-old Austrian citizen was arrested and jailed for one such threat. On 21 September, two girls, aged 14 and 15, were detained in Leibnitz for making shooting threats online. It was noted that as late as June 2026, social media posts on platforms like X continued to glorify the shooting in Graz and its perpetrator.

On 22 October, a 14-year-old boy was arrested in Graz for repeatedly threatening a school shooting and creating a private Snapchat group titled "Bombenleger" ("Bomber") to discuss a potential attack. A 15-year-old boy was also arrested for offering to participate. Both boys were temporarily jailed, with their legal defense stating that they were joking and unaware of the seriousness of the threats. In June 2026, they were sentenced to three months and two months probation respectively. On 20 November, a 15-year-old student was arrested in Linz for calling police and threatening a shooting at his school. The boy was convicted in January 2026 and sentenced to 120 hours of community service.

In late September 2025, a 33-year-old Leibnitz woman was arrested on fraud charges, after it was found that she had opened a donation fund a day after the shooting, claiming to be collecting money for the victims' families, but keeping the €37,000 in donations for herself. While jailed, she also came under investigation for falsely obtaining €23,000 in social welfare and a private dress sale where the product was not delivered. In May 2026, she was sentenced to 21 months imprisonment, six of which are compulsory, followed by mandatory probation and psychotherapy.

== Reactions ==
On 10 June, Chancellor Christian Stocker (ÖVP) cancelled all appointments for the day and travelled to Graz with interior minister Gerhard Karner (ÖVP) to coordinate the government response. They spoke at a news conference with education minister Christoph Wiederkehr (NEOS), Styrian governor Mario Kunasek (FPÖ) and Graz mayor Elke Kahr (KPÖ); Stocker announced three days of national mourning that started on 11 June 2025. On 16 June, Stocker vowed to tighten gun laws later the same week. Education minister Christoph Wiederkehr announced that the school will remain closed until further notice, emphasizing that the immediate priority is to support the victims and ensure the school remains a safe environment moving forward.

On 10 June, the Austria national football team announced that they would wear black armbands for their World Cup qualifier against San Marino later in the day. That same day, the Vienna Philharmonic announced that it would open the annual Summer Night Concert with "Air" from Johann Sebastian Bach's Orchestral Suite No. 3 in D Major in memory of the victims.

On 11 June, mayor Kahr, representing the view of the communist KPÖ, called for a ban on private handgun ownership in Austria and for the firearm law to be changed accordingly. Soon after, the Austrian Green Party also announced their support for the proposal. President Alexander Van der Bellen supported a review of the existing firearm law and certain improvements to prevent firearm rampages or killings like in Graz. The far-right FPÖ was categorically opposed to banning private firearm ownership and said that the current firearm law is already very strict. The centrist government parties ÖVP, SPÖ and NEOS did not offer an opinion on the issue due to the period of mourning the victims. All five of the major Austrian political parties postponed their party conferences in Styria out of respect for the victims.

On 16 June, Stocker announced that the government would introduce laws for "stricter eligibility requirements for gun ownership and restrictions for certain risk groups". On 4 July, Stocker announced that the minimum age for buying a firearm would be raised from 21 to 25, the waiting period for firearms would increase from three days to four weeks and psychological exams for firearm licences were set to be revised. Additionally, it was planned to double the number of school psychologists by 2028. The firearms law reform was passed in September 2025, with FPÖ criticising the change as a "general attack" on weapon owners. In February 2026, all schools in Salzburg state introduced crisis plans in the case of a shooting.

On 12 November 2025, the parents of seven of the killed students stated that they were planning to sue the Austrian government through an Amtshaftungsklage over perceived faults in the old law for obtaining firearms. The same day, five of the families received a letter from a supposed "whistle blower" at the Medical University of Graz, claiming cover-ups and misconduct in treatment, which was later discredited. The lawsuit threat was rescinded the following day when the government agreed to open a €20 million fund to provide compensation for pain and suffering and cover therapy and physical treatment costs.

In February 2026, the Ministry of the Interior and the victims' rights organisation Weisser Ring urged Austrian media to respect the dignity of the victims and their families, who complained over perpetuation of victimisation by the prolonged "sensationalist and emotional media coverage", noting that one girl's father had learnt of his daughter's death through the news before police could inform him. Vice Chancellor Andreas Babler stated that there were plans to introduce quality assurance by media funding. Styria Police spokesperson Markus Lamb also recommended more oversight in media, particularly in regards to the extensive reports on the perpetrator's background, over concerns of copycat crime.

== See also ==
- Columbine effect
- List of school shootings in Europe
- List of mass shootings in Austria
