= Nüziders =

- Municipality
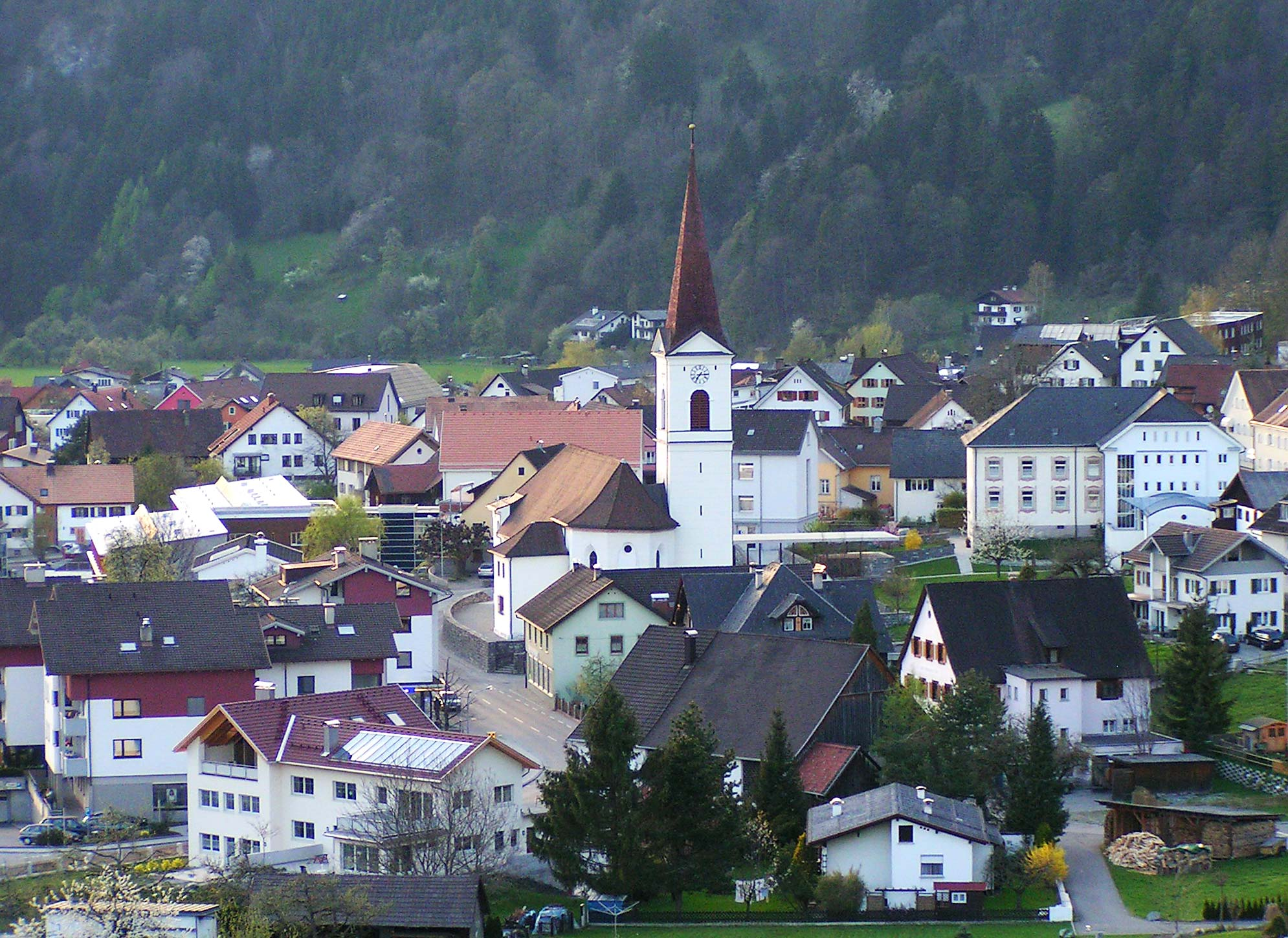

- Coat of arms

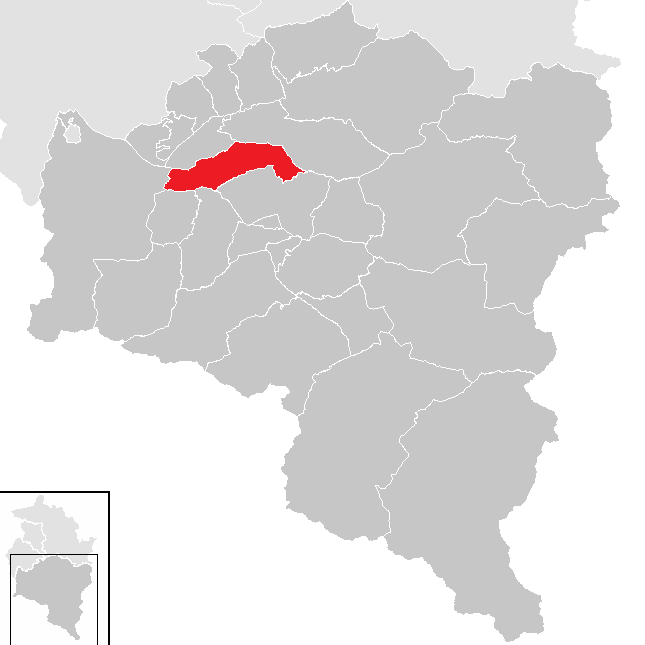
- Location in the district

- Location within Austria
- Coordinates: 47°10′00″N 09°48′00″E
- Country: Austria
- State: Vorarlberg
- District: Bludenz

Government
  - Mayor: Peter Neier

Area
  - Total: 22.1 km^{2} (8.5 sq mi)
- Elevation: 562 m (1,844 ft)

Population (2018-01-01)
  - Total: 4,962
  - Density: 225/km^{2} (582/sq mi)
- Time zone: UTC+1 (CET)
  - Summer (DST): UTC+2 (CEST)
- Postal code: 6714
- Area code: 05552
- Vehicle registration: BZ
- Website: www.nueziders.at

Nüziders is a municipality in the district of Bludenz in the Austrian state of Vorarlberg. It was capital of the historical County of Sonnenberg which is referred to in the formal style of the Emperor of Austria.

== Population ==
Historical population
Year	Pop.	±%
1869	866	—
1880	935	+8.0%
1890	922	−1.4%
1900	969	+5.1%
1910	1,093	+12.8%
1923	1,085	−0.7%
1934	1,305	+20.3%
1939	1,360	+4.2%
1951	1,641	+20.7%
1961	1,924	+17.2%
1971	2,821	+46.6%
1981	3,644	+29.2%
1991	4,171	+14.5%
2001	4,478	+7.4%
2011	4,856	+8.4%

== Transport ==
Nüziders railway station is an intermediate station on the Vorarlberg railway line (Vorarlbergbahn) traversing Vorarlberg in a north-south direction. The railway station is called at by the S1 regional train service of Vorarlberg S-Bahn, operated by Austrian Federal Railways (ÖBB).
