= Ernst Dostal =

Austrian Murderer

Ernst Dostal (born 1951 or 1952 – June 26, 1973 in Altlengbach, Lower Austria) was one of Austria's most violent criminals, and the one sought after by the largest ever investigation triggered by the Second Austrian Republic.

== Murder of Richard Dvorak ==
On Wednesday, June 13, 1973, a gendarme patrol discovered on the roadside of the Süd Autobahn near a bridge in the Guntramsdorf district a wide crater with bone splinters and body parts. The authorities' first suspicions was directed towards an active gang of burglars, which opened safes with explosives and in the last two weeks had three successful slams in Lower Austria. The investigators assumed that perhaps one of the gang members had suffered an accident with the explosives or had been killed in this way by his accomplices. A second theory was that someone had planned an attack on a bus transport full of Jewish emigrants to the transit camp Schloss Schönau, but had blown himself up by improper handling. The police suspected several times that the perpetrator was Emmanuel K., who had been released just under four months earlier from prison and was considered to be untraceable.

Finally on June 15, the deceased was identified. It was 30-year-old family man Richard Dvorak, a contract agent working for Vienna City Hall. His mother provided the crucial clues that led to his identification. Ernst Dostal, who was considered a close friend of Dvorak, was first questioned about the homicide on June 18 and stated that he had not seen Dvorak for days.

== Rampage in Rennweg barracks ==
On Friday, June 22, Dostal was again invited for questioning on Richard Dvorak in the Rennweg barracks in Vienna. Because he was not considered a suspect, he was not searched.

When Dostal testified that he had been to a certain inn during the night, but the officials pointed out that it was closed at the time, he suddenly reached into jacket's pockets and began firing at the officers from two hidden pistols. The officers Ottokar Pücher (38), Matthias Horvath (42) and Harald Syrinek (48) were hit and severely injured; Pücher and Syrinek were in critical condition for days after. In an attempt to escape from the building, he wounded 57-year-old civil servant Leopold Ullrich with a shot to the stomach before he finally escaped by jumping from a window on the first floor. He carjacked a passing car and continued his escape to the South Tyrolean square.

== Manhunt and double murder ==
Immediately after the incident, the Dostals' house in Tullnerbach, their farm near Ober-Grafendorf and a rented apartment in Vienna were searched, whereby the gendarmes found a substantial collection of weapons. On the farm, the officers also found a soundproof torture chamber with stretched beds and necklaces next to a wooden human figure which was shot on, with targets and mountains of empty shell casings.

Even Robert Dostal, Ernst's father, had submerged before the killing spree and was now sought by arrest warrant.

On Sunday morning Ernst Dostal shot the couple Viktor (45) and Johanna Steiger (43) in the weekend house in Sachsengang, where he was observed by a neighbour. The police assumed that Dostal had already broken into the couple's weekend home from Vienna-Döbling on Saturday and stayed there overnight.

On Monday morning, a coordination center was set up in the Interior Ministry of Vienna, in which all information about Dostal was collected. A radio journal service, which could receive 200 radio conversations with all the individual patrol cars at the same time, evaluated the messages and directed emergency vehicles to the locations. The Federal Army provided special maps of Lower Austria, on which the security authorities could locate and track every possible escape route. Later that same day, the "Suburban Line Action" was set in motion; safety chains were set up on all the entry and exit roads from Vienna to Lower Austria and vice versa, and every vehicle was inspected. Traffic control stations were also located in the surrounding districts of Vienna.

Dostal's crimes had triggered the largest manhunt in the history of the Second Republic.

== Suicide ==
The attempt to contact his father with an encrypted newspaper advertisement revealed his whereabouts: '1919, Monday waited in vain on the tower for you, I will try Wednesday and Thursday at 10 o'clock again. Am currently on 02774/326 reach." Since 1919 is the year of birth's Dostal's father and the homeowner of the associated phone number stated that he had not give up the ad, special units surrounded the Altlengbach property on Tuesday and stormed it using tear gas. Although the property was deserted, Dostal's escape car was in the garage.

Dostal himself, however, was shortly observed leaving a nearby property. After a short firefight, he committed suicide by shooting himself in the head.

Subsequent investigations revealed that Dvorak and Dostal were planning a kidnapping series together. When Dvorak wanted to back out, Dostal shot him and blew up his body, hiding his clothes and bones to make identification impossible and making the investigation more difficult.

Dostal's father Robert, who was also involved in the crime, traveled to Switzerland after his son's escape and then to Lüneberg in Germany, where he also committed suicide by shooting himself in a hotel room.

Officer Ottokar Pücher, who was injured in the Rennweger barracks by Dostal with a shot to the neck, remained paralyzed from his neck down until his death in 2010.

== Literature ==
- Andreas and Regina Zeppelzauer: The most spectacular murders in Austria. Psychograms, pictures and reports. V. F. collector publishing house, Graz 2005.
- Hans Bankl: The knife is in the back: Stories from Forensic Medicine. Kremayr & Scheriau, Vienna 2001, ISBN 3-218-00692-9.
