= Nenzing =

- Municipality
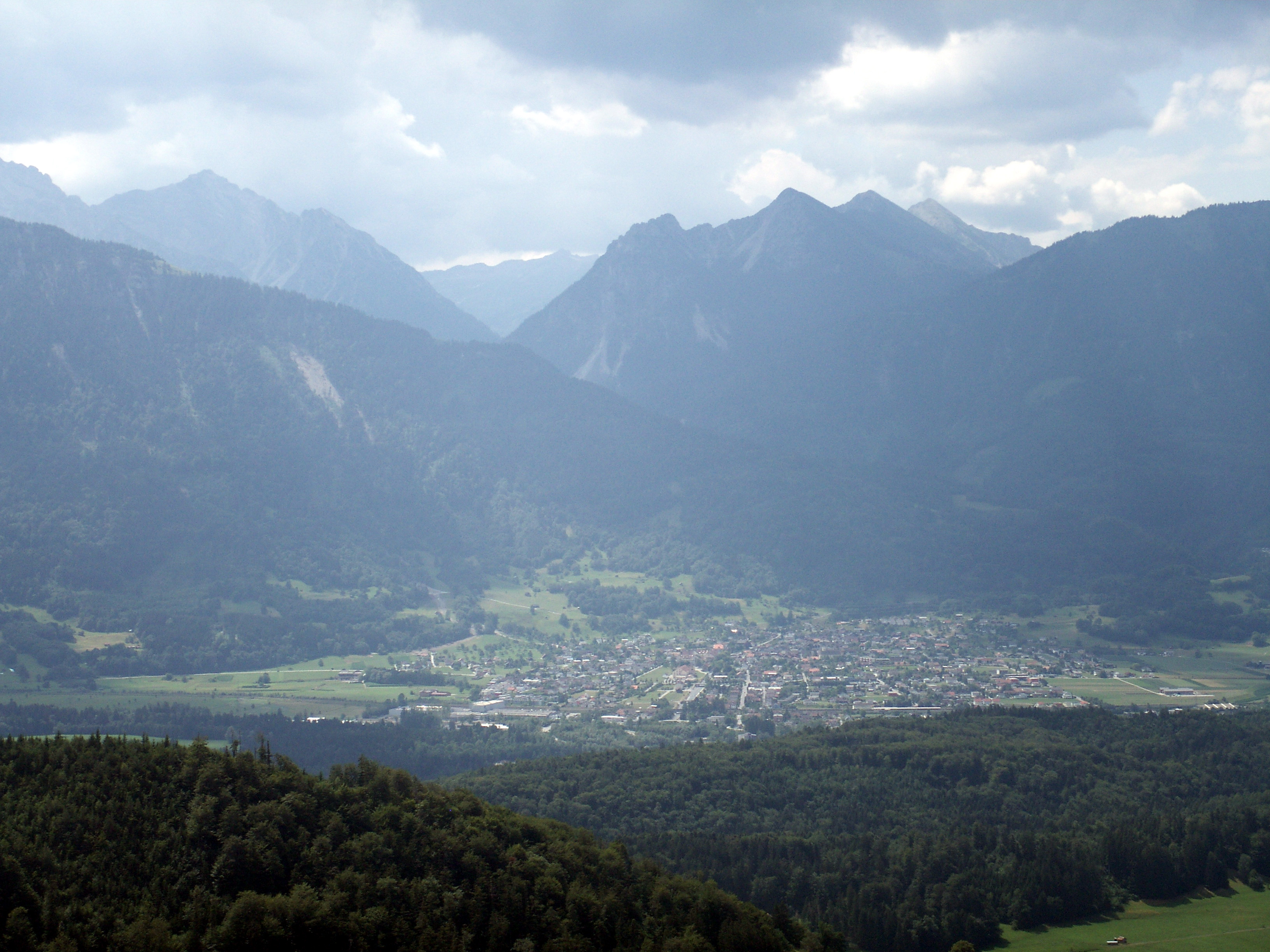

- Coat of arms

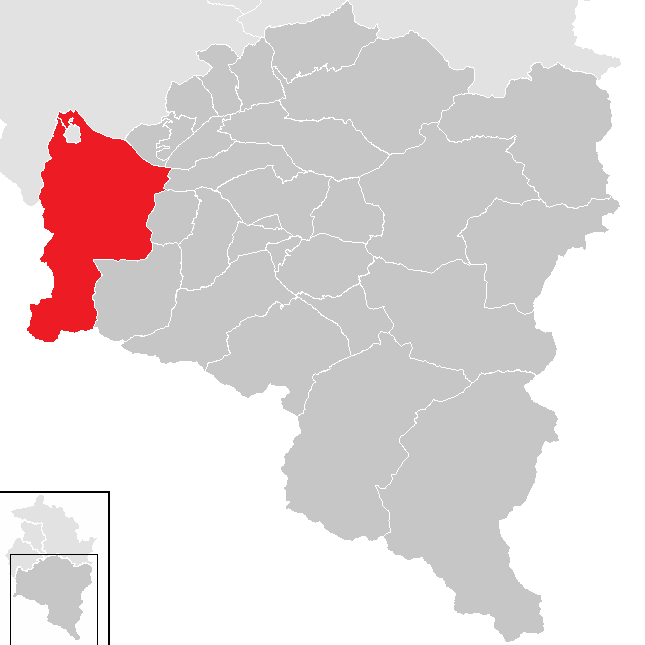
- Location in the district

- Location within Austria
- Coordinates: 47°10′N 9°41′E
- Country: Austria
- State: Vorarlberg
- District: Bludenz

Government
  - Mayor: Florian Kasseroler

Area
  - Total: 110.35 km^{2} (42.61 sq mi)
- Elevation: 530 m (1,740 ft)

Population (2018-01-01)
  - Total: 6,239
  - Density: 56.54/km^{2} (146.4/sq mi)
- Time zone: UTC+1 (CET)
  - Summer (DST): UTC+2 (CEST)
- Postal code: 6710
- Website: http://www.nenzing.at

Nenzing is a market town in the district of Bludenz in the Austrian state of Vorarlberg with a population of 6,225 (2022).

== Population ==
Historical population
Year	Pop.	±%
1869	1,975	—
1880	1,928	−2.4%
1890	1,982	+2.8%
1900	2,129	+7.4%
1910	2,252	+5.8%
1923	2,212	−1.8%
1934	2,521	+14.0%
1939	2,531	+0.4%
1951	3,478	+37.4%
1961	3,478	+0.0%
1971	4,412	+26.9%
1981	4,797	+8.7%
1991	5,140	+7.2%
2001	5,652	+10.0%
2011	5,991	+6.0%
2021	6,205	+3.6%

== Education ==
There are 5 kindergarten, 4 primary schools and there is one secondary modern school in Nenzing.

== Politics ==
Michael Hartmann from the Austrian People's Party is the mayor of Nenzing since 2025.

== Transport ==
Nenzing railway station is on the main west–east route connecting the Vorarlberg railway line (Vorarlbergbahn) in the directions of Bregenz and Bludenz, continuing eastward over the Arlberg Railway line to Innsbruck and beyond. The train system is operated by the Austrian Federal Railways (ÖBB), including regional train services of Vorarlberg S-Bahn.
