= Bludenz railway station =

Railway station in Vorarlberg, Austria

Bludenz
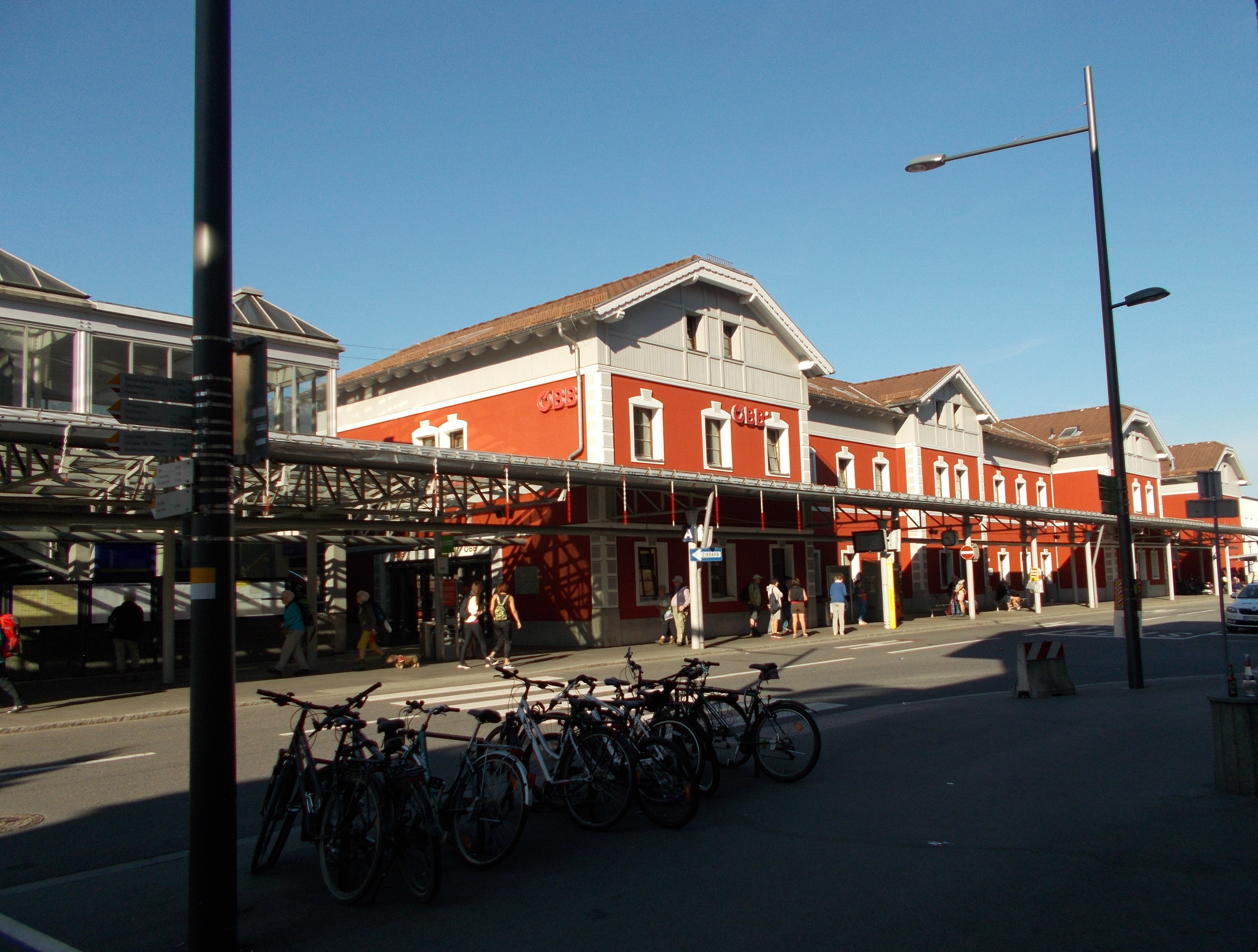
- The station building.

General information
- Location: Bahnhofplatz; 6700 Bludenz; Austria
- Coordinates: 47°09′18″N 09°48′53″E
- Elevation: 558 m (AA)
- Owner: Austrian Federal Railways (ÖBB)
- Operator: ÖBB, WESTbahn, DB
- Lines: Arlberg railway Bludenz–Schruns railway Vorarlberg railway
- Distance: 136.286 km (84.684 mi) from Innsbruck Hbf

History
- Opened: 1872

Services
| Preceding station | DB Fernverkehr | Following station |
|---|---|---|
| Feldkirch towards Dortmund Hbf | ICE 62 Bodensee | Langen am Arlberg towards Innsbruck Hbf |
| Preceding station | ÖBB | Following station |
| Feldkirch towards Frankfurt (Main) Hbf | Railjet Express | Langen am Arlberg towards Vienna Airport |
| Feldkirch towards Zürich HB | Railjet Express | St. Anton am Arlberg towards Vienna Airport |
| Feldkirch towards Zürich HB | Railjet Express | St. Anton am Arlberg towards Bratislava hl.st. |
| Feldkirch towards Zürich HB | Railjet Express | St. Anton am Arlberg towards Budapest Keleti |
| Feldkirch towards Bregenz | Nightjet | Langen am Arlberg towards Wien Hbf |
| Feldkirch towards Zürich HB | Nightjet | Langen am Arlberg towards Graz Hbf |
| Feldkirch towards Zürich HB | EuroNight | St. Anton am Arlberg towards Budapest Keleti |
| Feldkirch towards Zürich HB | EuroNight | St. Anton am Arlberg towards Praha hl.n. |
| Feldkirch towards Zürich HB | EuroNight | St. Anton am Arlberg towards Zagreb |
| Feldkirch towards Zürich HB | EuroCity (Transalpin) | St. Anton am Arlberg towards Graz Hbf |
| Nenzing towards Lindau-Insel | REX 1 | Terminus |
| Preceding station | | Following station |
| Frastanz toward Lindau-Insel | WESTbahn | St. Anton am Arlberg toward Wien Westbahnhof |
| Preceding station | Vorarlberg S-Bahn | Following station |
| Nüziders towards Lindau-Insel | S1 | Terminus |
| Terminus | S4 | Bludenz-Moos towards Schruns |
Location
- Location within Austria Location within Vorarlberg

Bludenz railway station (German: Bahnhof Bludenz) serves the city of Bludenz, in the Bludenz district of the Austrian federal state of Vorarlberg. It is owned and operated by the Austrian Federal Railways (ÖBB). Opened in 1872, it forms the junction between the Arlberg railway and the Vorarlberg railway. The station is also a terminus of the Bludenz–Schruns railway (Montafonerbahn).

Regional train services belong to the Vorarlberg S-Bahn, with the S1 service also being part of the Bodensee S-Bahn.

== Location ==
Bludenz railway station is situated in Bahnhofplatz, right in the heart of the city, on the east bank of the Ill river. Like the river, the lines passing through the station run in a north west - south easterly direction at this point.

The station building is on the northeastern side of the lines, facing the inner city. On the other, southwestern, side of the lines is the goods yard.

The next operational railway station on the Arlberg Railway line is Langen am Arlberg. There are five defunct railway stations in between: Braz, Hintergasse, Dalaas, Wald am Arlberg and Klösterle.

== Features ==
=== Station building ===
The old station building is laid out in a plan of three axes. The three key parts of the building are arranged with eaves facing each other, and are connected by a structure running parallel to the running line. Extending along this structure, on the forecourt side, is a recently constructed large canopy.

Inside the building, apart from the typical station facilities, are offices and a canteen for railway workers.

=== Station yard ===
Bludenz has unusually extensive railway facilities. The station yard covers an area of approximately 200 ha. For passenger traffic, there are a main platform and two other platforms with a total of four tracks. In addition, there are two stub sidings one at the northwest end of the yard, and the other at the southeast ends. In the centre of the yard there is a through track.

In the northwest corner, since the introduction of a second running line completed from Bregenz only in 1995, there are several tracks for stabling locomotives and railcars. South of that point there is a new motive power depot with ten tracks.

Eight sidings are provided for goods traffic.

== Renovations ==
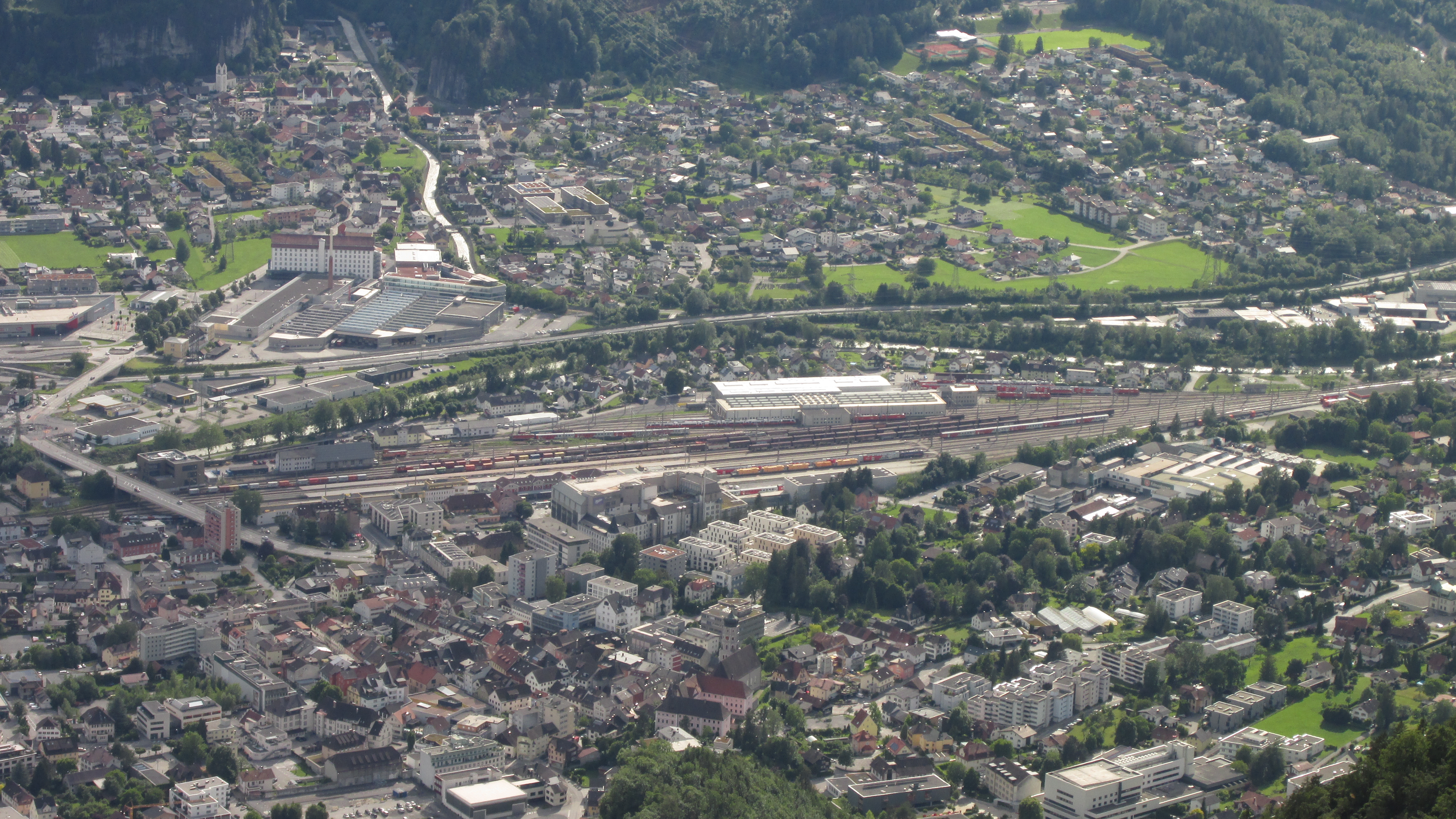
View from East to Bludenz (in front), Railway station (mid) and Bürs (in Background)

After twelve years of discussion, the City of Bludenz decided on 26 September 2008 that the station area would be renovated. One effect of the renovations would be that individual motorised traffic near the station would largely disappear. Apart from the station forecourt, the barracks room to its north would be modified, and the workers' room rebuilt. The project was expected to be completed in 2011.

== Services ==
As of the December 2024 timetable change, the following regional train services exist (the S1 is also part of Bodensee S-Bahn):

  - EC Transalpin: daily service between Zurich HB and Graz.
- Intercity-Express ICE 62: one train-pair per day between Dortmund Hbf and Innsbruck Hbf.
- EuroNight (EN) / Nightjet (NJ):
  - NJ: daily overnight trains between Bregenz/Zurich HB and Wien Hbf.
  - EN: daily overnight trains between Zurich HB and Budapest, Prague or Zagreb
- WESTbahn green: one train per day and direction to Lindau-Insel and Wien Westbahnhof.
- REX 1: two trains in the morning on weekdays to Lindau-Insel.
- Vorarlberg S-Bahn
  - S1: half-hourly service to Bregenz Hafen, with some trains continuing to Lindau-Insel.
  - S4: half-hourly service to Schruns.

== See also ==
- History of rail transport in Austria
- Rail transport in Austria
