= Bludenz District =

Coordinates: 47.1°N 9.9°E

Bludenz District Bezirk Bludenz
- District
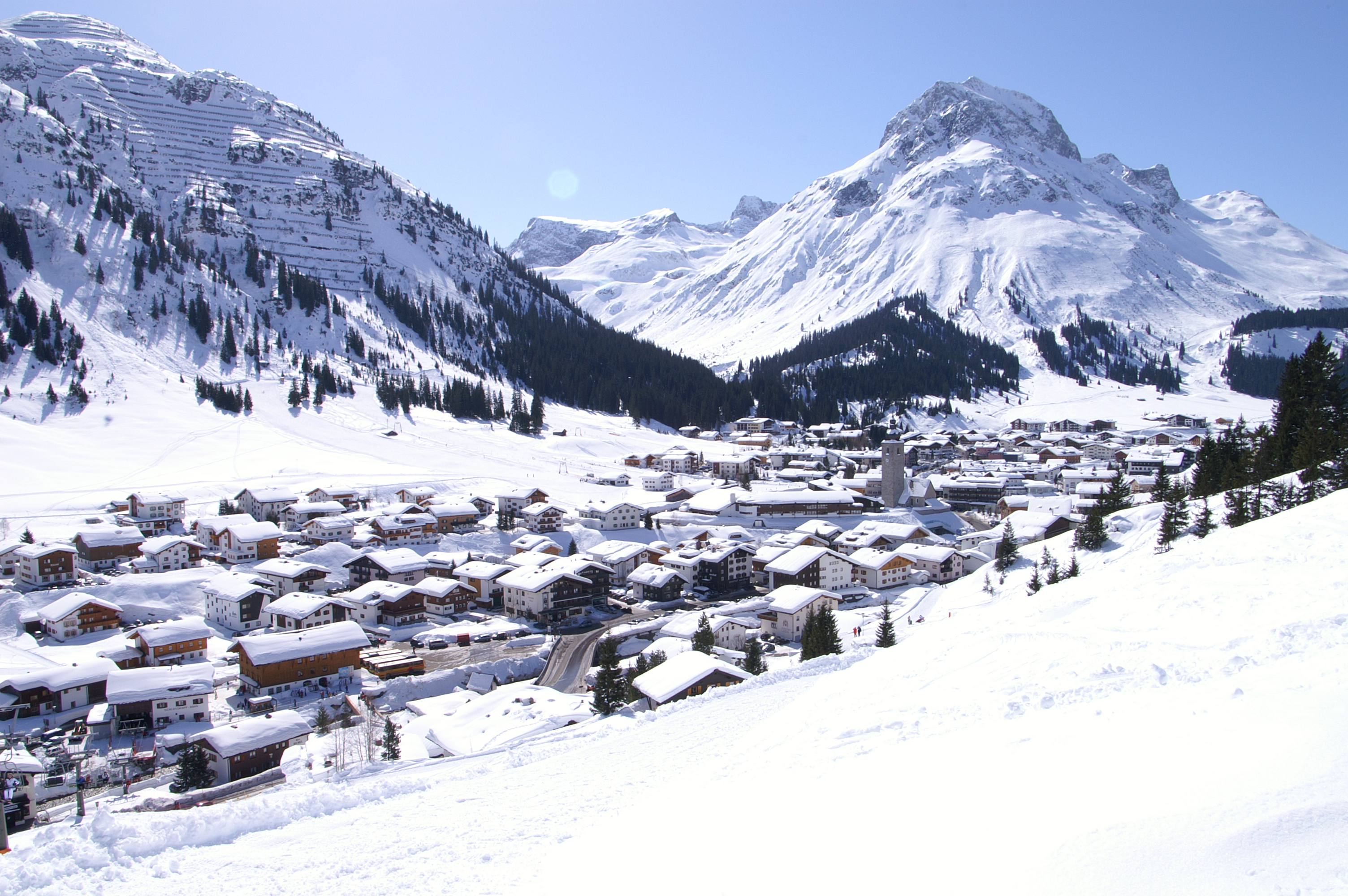
- Omeshorn rising above Lech am Arlberg
- Country: Austria
- State: Vorarlberg
- Number of municipalities: 29
- Administrative seat: Bludenz

Government
  - District Governor: Harald Dreher

Area
  - Total: 1,287.63 km^{2} (497.16 sq mi)

Population (2012)
  - Total: 61,407
  - Density: 47.690/km^{2} (123.52/sq mi)
- Time zone: UTC+01:00 (CET)
  - Summer (DST): UTC+02:00 (CEST)
- Vehicle registration: BZ
- Website: bludenz.at

The Bezirk Bludenz is an administrative district (Bezirk) in Vorarlberg, Austria.

Area of the district is 1,287.63 km², population is 61,407 (January 1, 2012), and population density 48 persons per km². Administrative center of the district is Bludenz.

Historical population
Year	Pop.	±%
1869	21,436	—
1880	22,448	+4.7%
1890	23,290	+3.8%
1900	24,307	+4.4%
1910	25,461	+4.7%
1923	26,346	+3.5%
1934	30,621	+16.2%
1939	31,672	+3.4%
1951	38,360	+21.1%
1961	43,000	+12.1%
1971	49,539	+15.2%
1981	53,104	+7.2%
1991	56,944	+7.2%
2001	60,471	+6.2%
Source: Statistik Austria

== Administrative divisions ==
The district is divided into 29 municipalities. One of them is a town and two of them are market towns.

=== Towns ===
1. Bludenz (13,801)

=== Market towns ===
1. Nenzing (5,976)
2. Schruns (3,683)

=== Municipalities ===
1. Bartholomäberg (2,281)
2. Blons (324)
3. Bludesch (2,220)
4. Brand (666)
5. Bürs (3,113)
6. Bürserberg (528)
7. Dalaas (1,512)
8. Fontanella (433)
9. Gaschurn (1,515)
10. Innerbraz (933)
11. Klösterle (690)
12. Lech am Arlberg (1,636)
13. Lorüns (281)
14. Ludesch (3,375)
15. Nüziders (4,880)
16. Raggal (822)
17. Sankt Anton im Montafon (751)
18. Sankt Gallenkirch (2,190)
19. Sankt Gerold (361)
20. Silbertal (860)
21. Sonntag (679)
22. Stallehr (288)
23. Thüringen (2,158)
24. Thüringerberg (683)
25. Tschagguns (2,169)
26. Vandans (2,599)

(population numbers January 1, 2012)
