= Brandnertal =

Coordinates: 47°07′18″N 9°46′00″E

The Brandnertal (also Brandner Tal) is a valley in the Austrian province of Vorarlberg as well as a ski resort named after the valley.

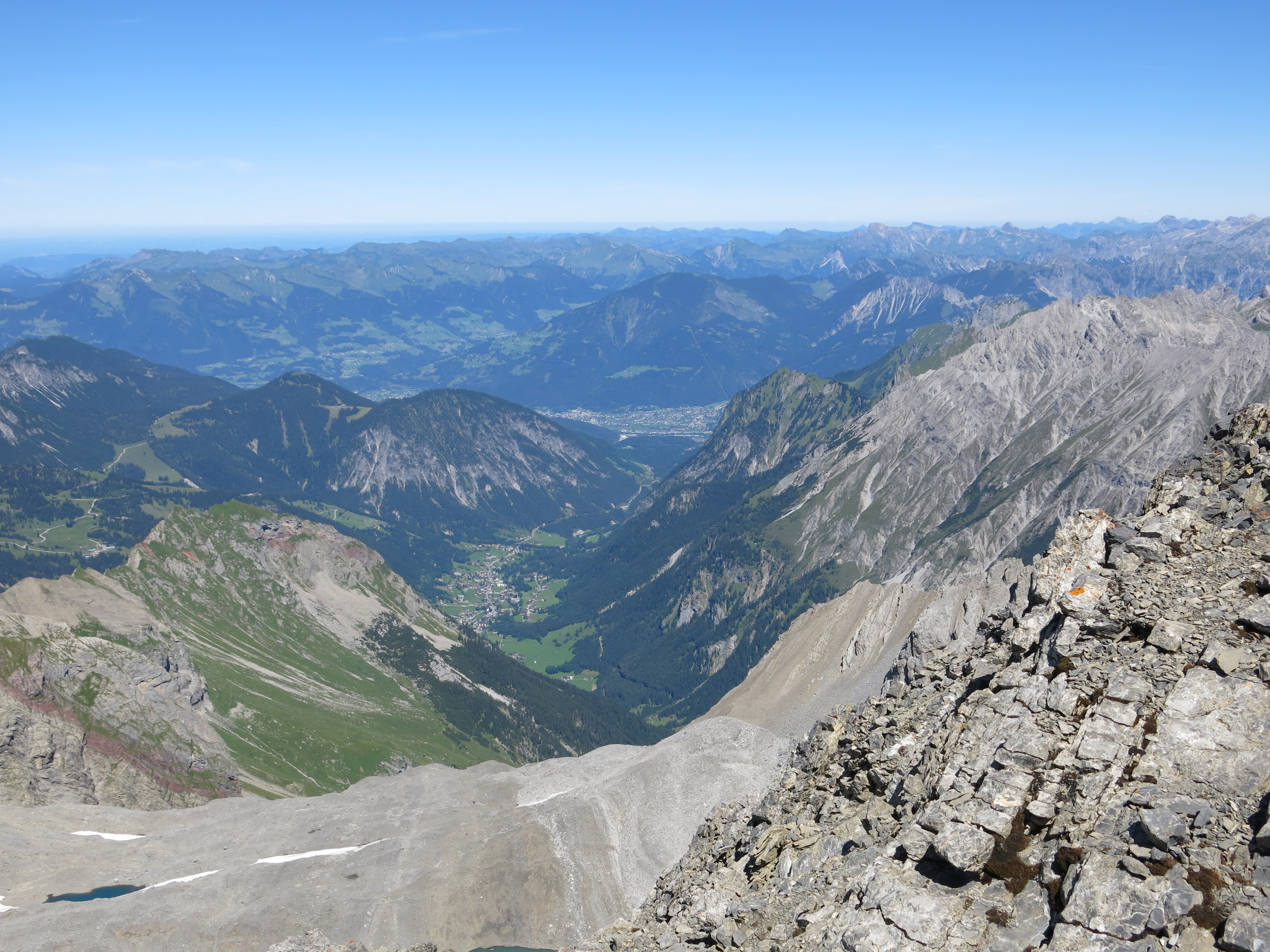
View of the Schesaplana peak into the Brandnertal valley.

== Geography ==
The Brandnertal is located in the southern part of Vorarlberg, in the far west of Austria. Adjacent to Switzerland, the Principality of Liechtenstein and Germany. In the immediate vicinity of the city of Bludenz starts the Brandnertal. From Bürs the valley rises, via Bürserberg to Brand, which is at an altitude of more than 1,000 m. The Schesaplana and the Lünersee, which lies at the foot of the highest peak of the Rätikon, form the end of the valley.

The valley is traversed by the river Alvier, which runs in the lower part through the romantic Bürserschlucht (a gorge), which can be accessed by means of a hiking path.

== Tourism ==
Tourism plays a big role in the economy of the Brandnertal valley. Winter tourism is more important, due to the mountains and ski-development. In the season of winter 2011/2012 a total of 236.090 overnight stays were accounted for. In summer 2012, overnight stays reached 181.654 booked nights.

The area is very family-friendly but also offers the usual big variety of alpine destinations with skiing, snowboarding, tobogganing, hiking or cross-country skiing. Together with the Montafon, the Brandnertal mountain railways can guarantee snow safety throughout the winter and guests have the opportunity to explore the numerous ski runs in the whole Montafon in addition to the Brandnertal. Many mountain and ski huts allow hiking on foot or on skies. The interactive hiking trail "Tierwelten Brandnertal" explains the animal life of the region.
