= Ignaz Anton von Indermauer =

Austrian aristocrat and statesman

Landvögte of Vorarlberg
- In office 1791 – 1796 (his death)
- Monarchs: Leopold II, Holy Roman Emperor (1791 – 1792); Francis II, Holy Roman Emperor (1792 – 1796)
- Preceded by: Karl von Schenk
- Succeeded by: Johann Jakob Matthäus Ritter von Vicari

Personal details
- Born: Ignaz Alois Anton von Indermauer zu Strelburg und Freifeld; 31 July 1759 Innsbruck, Austria
- Died: 10 August 1796 (aged 37) Convent of St. Peter, Bludenz, Austria

Ignaz Alois Anton von Indermauer zu Strelburg und Freifeld (July 31, 1759 – August 10, 1796) was an Austrian nobleman from Tyrol who served as the Landvögte and Kreishauptmann of Vorarlberg from 1791 until his death in 1796.

== Biography ==
Ignaz Alois Anton von Indermauer zu Strelburg und Freifeld was born into the Tyrolese noble family In der Maur zu Strelburg und Freifeld. He was educated in Innsbruck and studied law before joining the state service. In 1789 he arrived in Vorarlberg and led the administration of the district office there. He was appointed the Landvogt and Kreishauptmann, the Provincial Governor, district chief and representative of the Habsburg crown, of Vorarlberg in 1791. As Landvogt and Kreishauptmann, he oversaw legal and financial affairs. He was unpopular among conservatives, particularly for enforcing the Josephine reforms and conducting investigations against those who apposed the reforms. The legal and religious reforms made by Joseph II, Holy Roman Emperor caused outrage across Austria, continuing on after the death of Emperor Joseph II in 1790. The reforms included limiting the authority Rome had over the Catholic Church within the Holy Roman Empire. When war broke out between Austria and France, around the time of the French Revolution, Indermauer closed immigration to Vorarlberg from areas that had been affected by revolution and placed a ban on exported goods. This angered merchants working in textile production and seasonal workers from Vorarlberg who worked in France during the summer months.

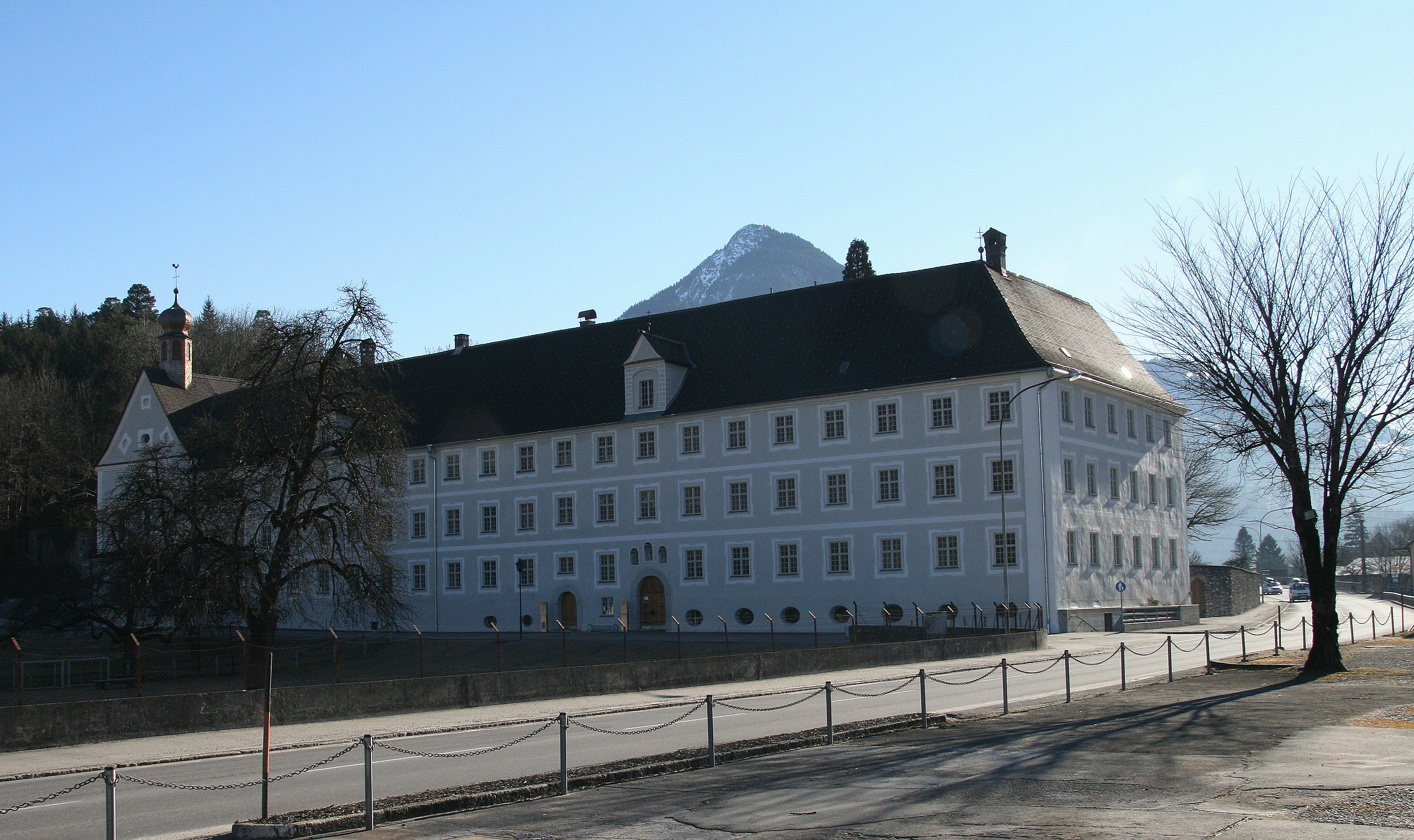
The Convent of St. Peter, where Indermauer was tortured and murdered.

=== Exile ===
On 8 August 1796, French troops were near the Austrian border and Indermauer was given terms by Austrian military officials to hand over Vorarlberg without a battle. Indermauer was told to leave for Tyrol, escaping in the early morning on 9 August 1796 by carriage with Weber, mayor of Bregenz, and Oberamstrat Franzin. They arrived in Bludenz and took refuge in the Convent of St. Peter, a Dominican monastic community, after being met with an angry mob upon arrival.

==== Capture and murder ====
The evening of his arrival to the Convent of St. Peter, hundreds of peasants from Bürs and Montafon, led by a baker named Franz Josef Tschofen, stormed the monastery and captured Indermauer, Weber, and Franzin. An attempt to rescue them was made by Father Bonaventura, the confessor of the nuns at the monastery, but he was unsuccessful. Indermauer, Weber, and Franzin were tortured for hours before being murdered by members of the mob. Franzin was stabbed to death with swords and Weber was dragged by his feet to the courtyard and shot. Indermauer was accused of treason for deserting his post and was dragged by his hair to the courtyard and shot. They were then undressed and their valuables were divided among the mob. Tschofen was later imprisoned for thirty years for the murders and thirteen others involved were sentenced to eight years in prison.
