= Alvier =

River in Austria

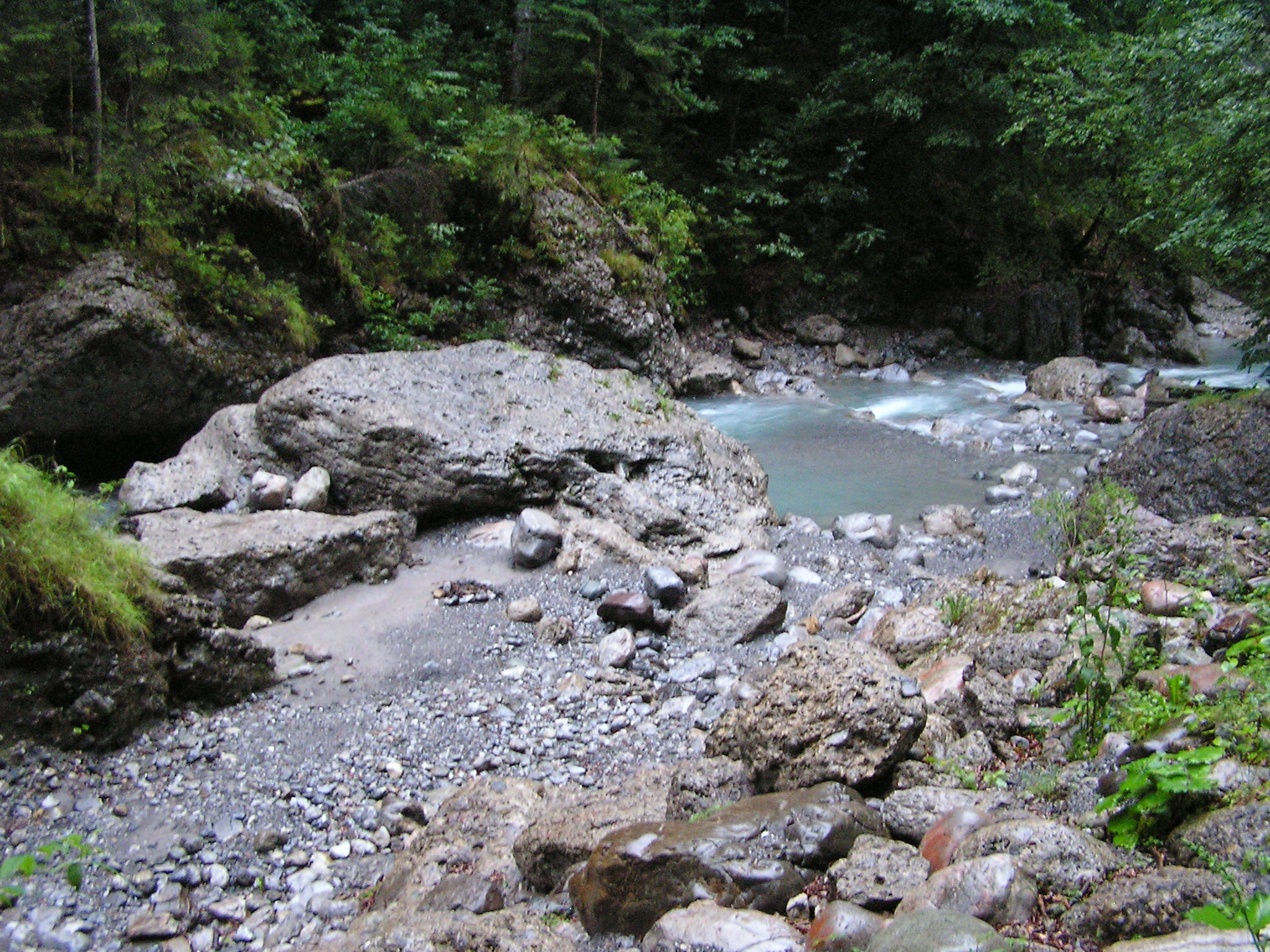

Location
- Country: Austria
- State: Vorarlberg

Physical characteristics
- Source
  - location: Brandnertal in Vorarlberg
- Mouth
  - location: Ill
  - coordinates: 47.1552°N 9.8087°E
- Length: 13 km (8.1 mi)

Basin features
- Progression: Ill→ Rhine→ North Sea

The Alvier is a mountain stream in Vorarlberg, Austria.

The Alvier flows through the Brandnertal passing through the municipalities of Brand and Bürs, where it discharges into the Ill.

The waters have created numerous Kolks in the riverbed which are populated by river and rainbow trouts. The clear, torrential river has potable water quality.

The stream feeds the 14 hectares (35 acres) large Alvierbad in Brand, an open-air bath which can be used free of charge with the Alpenregion Guest Card. Aquatic plants filter pollutants out of the water of the bath, which features especially in the summertime agreeable temperatures.
