= Siegfried Gasser =

Austrian politician (1941–2022)

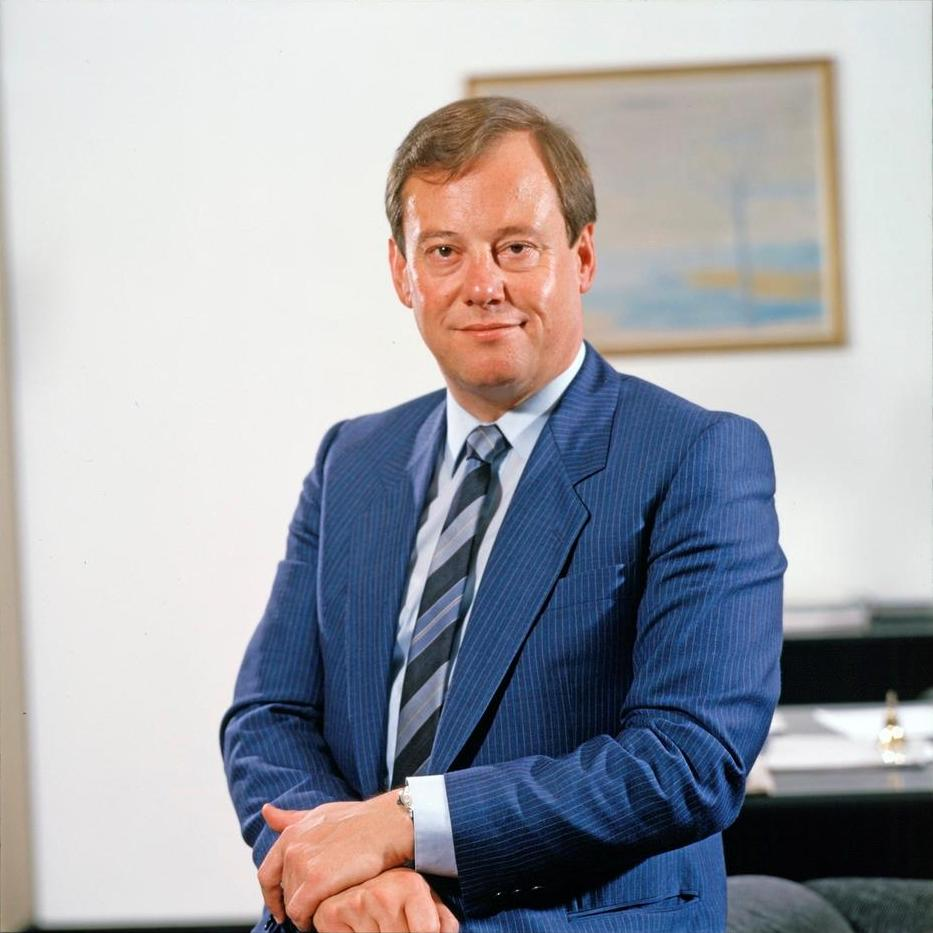
- Gasser in 1984

President of the Landtag of Vorarlberg
- In office September 1994 – September 1999
- Preceded by: Bertram Jäger
- Succeeded by: Manfred Dörler

Governor of Vorarlberg
- In office 6 November 1984 – 9 May 1990
- Preceded by: Rudolf Mandl
- Succeeded by: Herbert Sausgruber

Personal details
- Born: 16 July 1941 Saarwellingen, Germany
- Died: 2 May 2022 (aged 80)
- Party: ÖVP
- Education: University of Innsbruck

Siegfried Gasser (16 July 1941 – 2 May 2022) was an Austrian politician. A member of the Austrian People's Party, he served as governor of Vorarlberg from 1984 to 1990. He died on 2 May 2022 at the age of 80.
