= Convent of St. Peter (Bludenz, Austria) =

- Kloster St. Peter
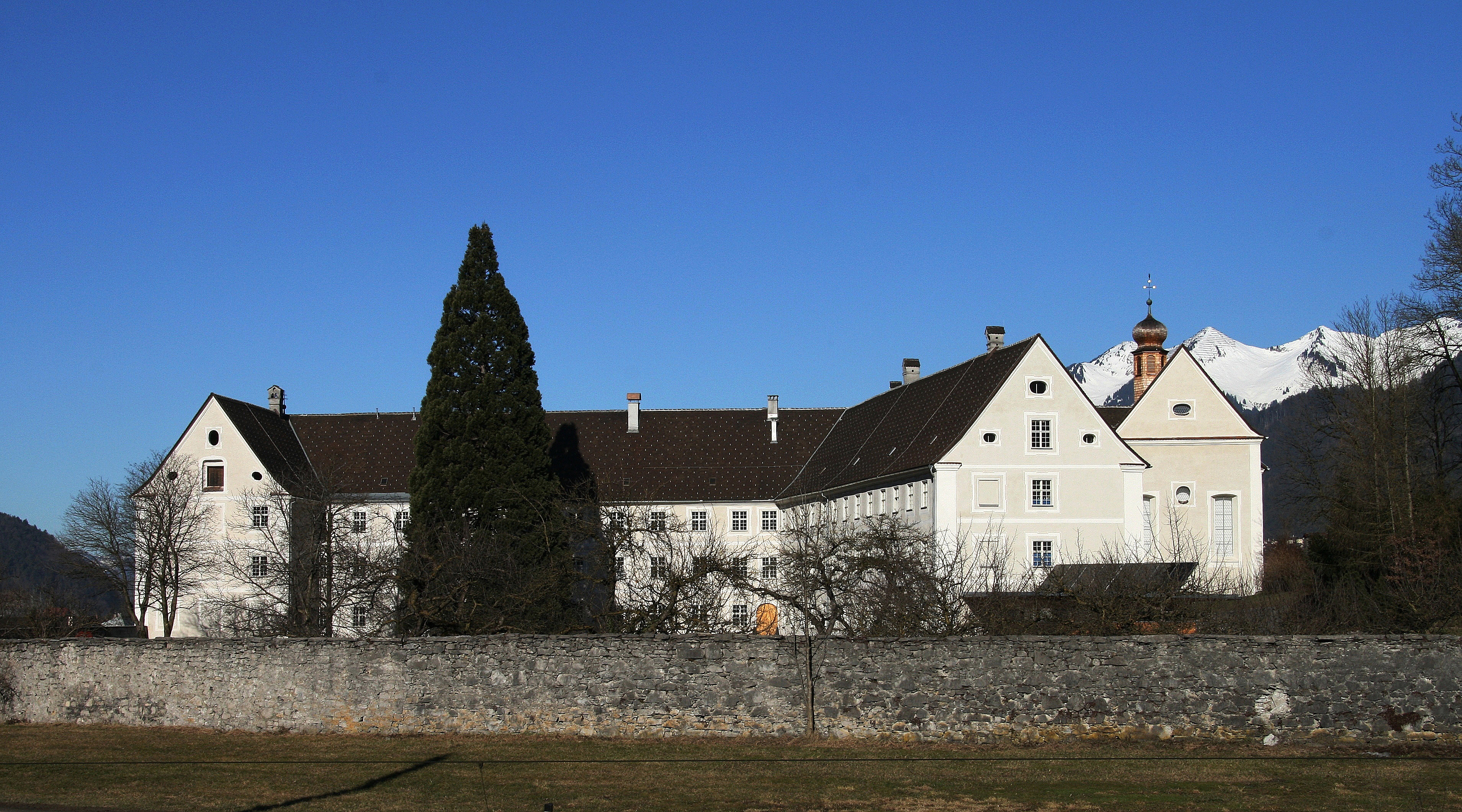
- Cloister of Saint Peter
- Convent of St. Peter
- 47°08′46″N 9°49′49″E
- Location: Bludenz
- Country: Austria
- Denomination: Roman Catholic

History
- Status: Active
- Founded: 1286

Architecture
- Functional status: Convent

Administration
- Archdiocese: Roman Catholic Archdiocese of Salzburg
Designations

The Convent of St. Peter is an ancient Catholic cloister in Bludenz, Vorarlberg, Austria. It is run by the Dominican Order. The convent was founded in 1286.

== History ==
Count Hugo I of Werdenberg-Heiligenberg, who had granted rights to Bludenz in 1274, left the right of patronage to St. Peter's Church to the Augustinian nuns of Ottenbach near Zürich. The monastic community changed leadership from the Augustinians to the Dominicans. The convent was a pilgrimage site and granted indulgences to visitors. The building of the convent began in 1286 and was completed in 1354. The convent served as a school for the daughters of noble families of Walgau Rhine Valley, and later also to the bourgeois families of the region.

In 1560 the plague raged in Bludenz. Almost all of the nuns died from disease. The convent remained closed and deserted for sixteen years. The original building was burned in a fire in 1552 and again in 1576. The present buildings were built in the early eighteenth century and expanded in 1721, 1723, and 1730.

In 1796 the Tyrolese Landvogt Ignaz Anton von Indermauer was murdered inside the convent by members of a peasant revolt.

From 1805 to 1814 a military hospital was run in the convent.

The convent was closed in 1941 by Nazi Germany. In 1945 it was officially abolished, and a hospital for occupied French troops was set up in one of the school buildings. In 1997 the convent church was restored and inaugurated as a Catholic community again.

== See also ==
- Catholic Church in Austria
