= Lünersee =

Lake in Austria

Lüner Lake
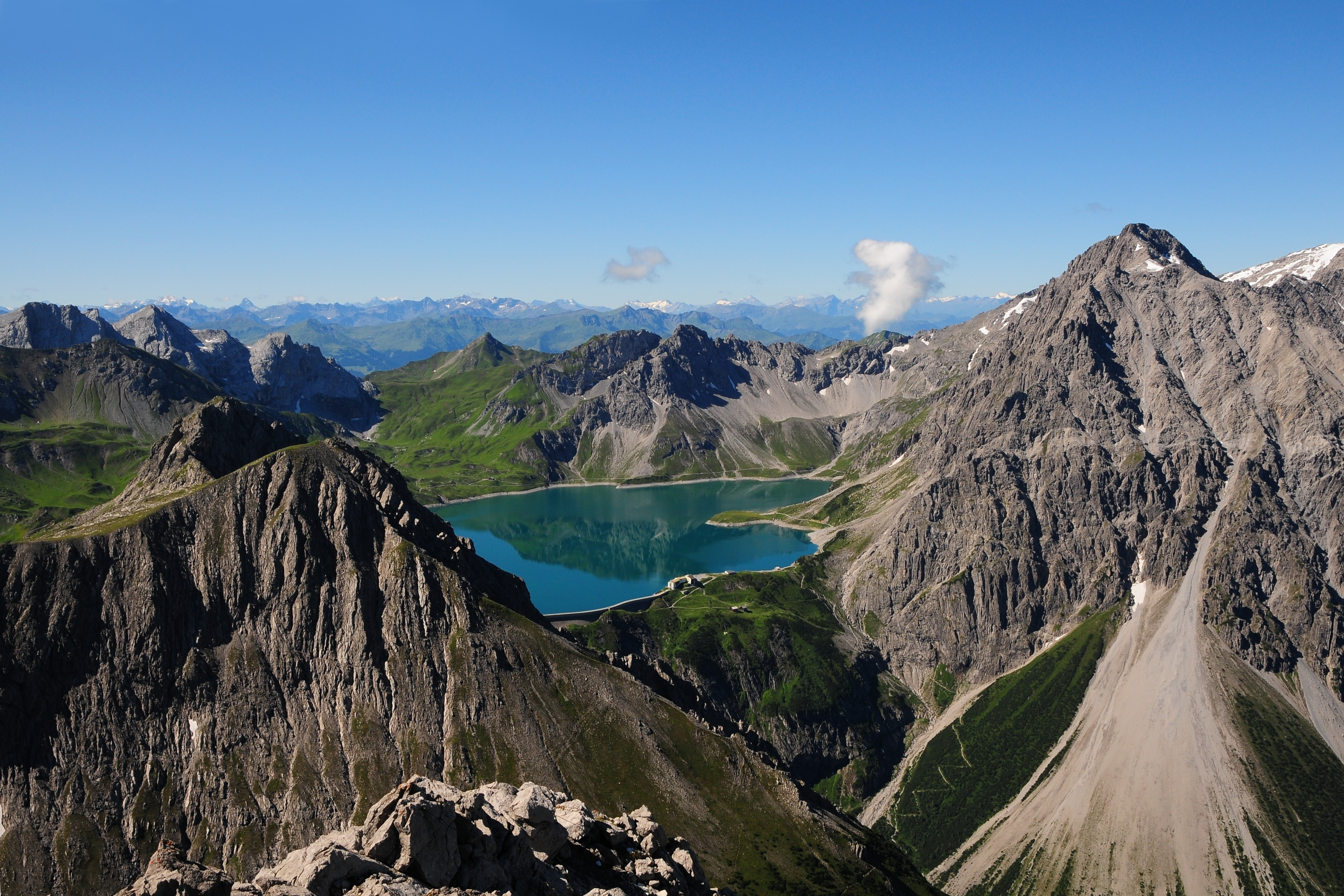

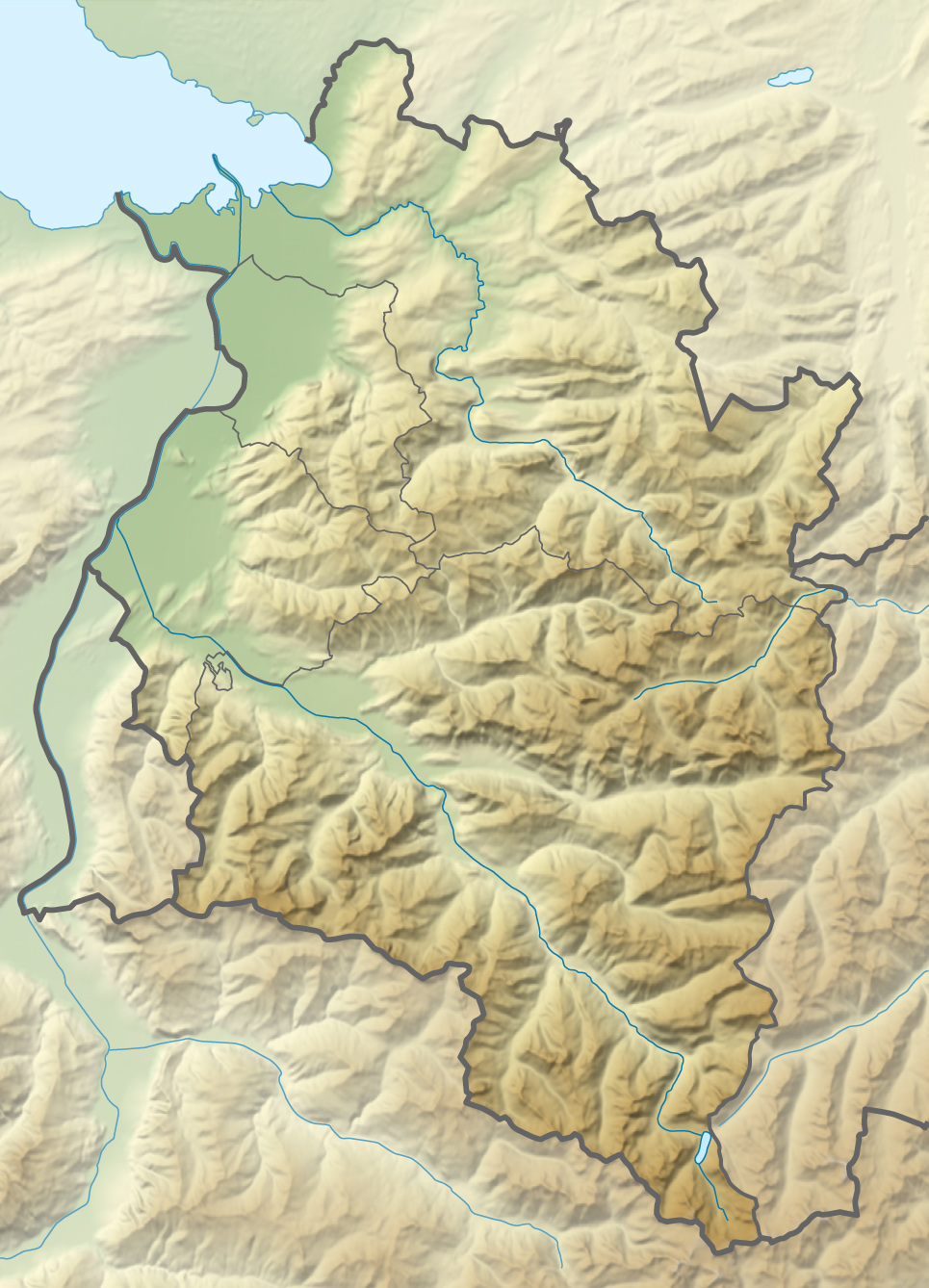
- Location within Vorarlberg
- Location: Vorarlberg
- Coordinates: 47°3′9″N 9°45′11″E
- Primary outflows: Alvier
- Basin countries: Austria
- Max. length: 1,500 m (4,900 ft)
- Max. width: 750 m (2,460 ft)
- Max. depth: 139 m (456 ft)
- Water volume: 0.156 km^{3} (126,000 acre⋅ft)
- Settlements: Bludenz

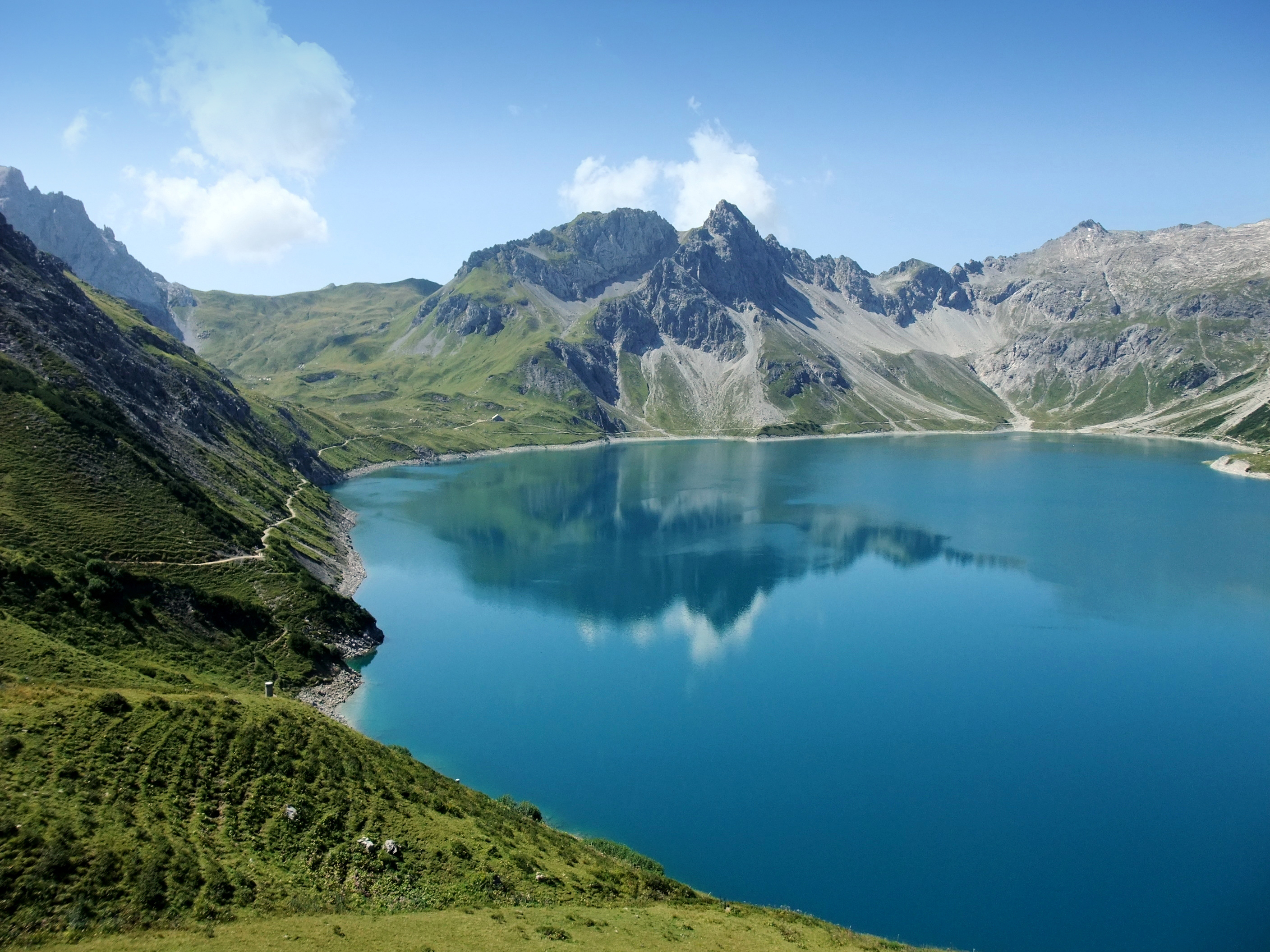

Lüner Lake (German Lünersee) is a large lake near the town of Bludenz in Vorarlberg, Austria.

The lake's depth was raised by 72 metres by the construction of a hydroelectric dam in 1958. The dam supplies water to four local power plants, Lünersee, Rodund I, Rodund II and Walgau. The lake is linked to the village of Brand by a cable car system, the Lünerseebahn.

== Gallery ==
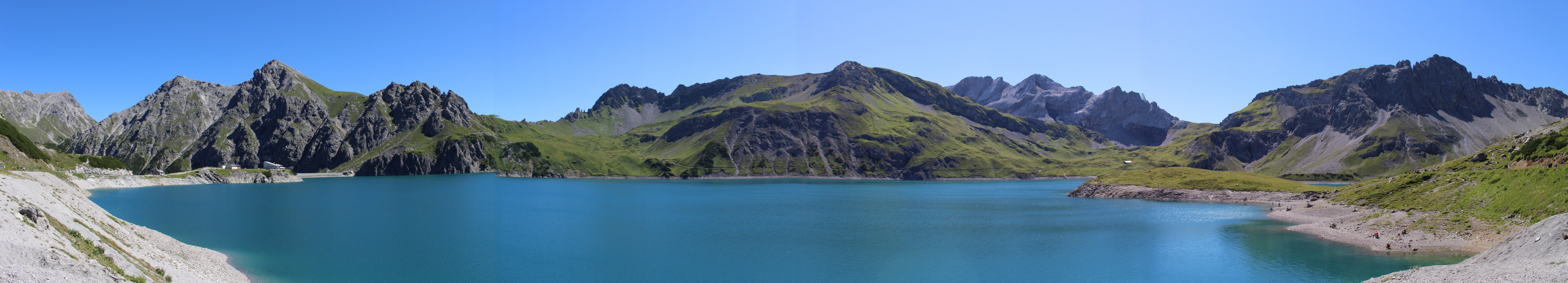
Panorama
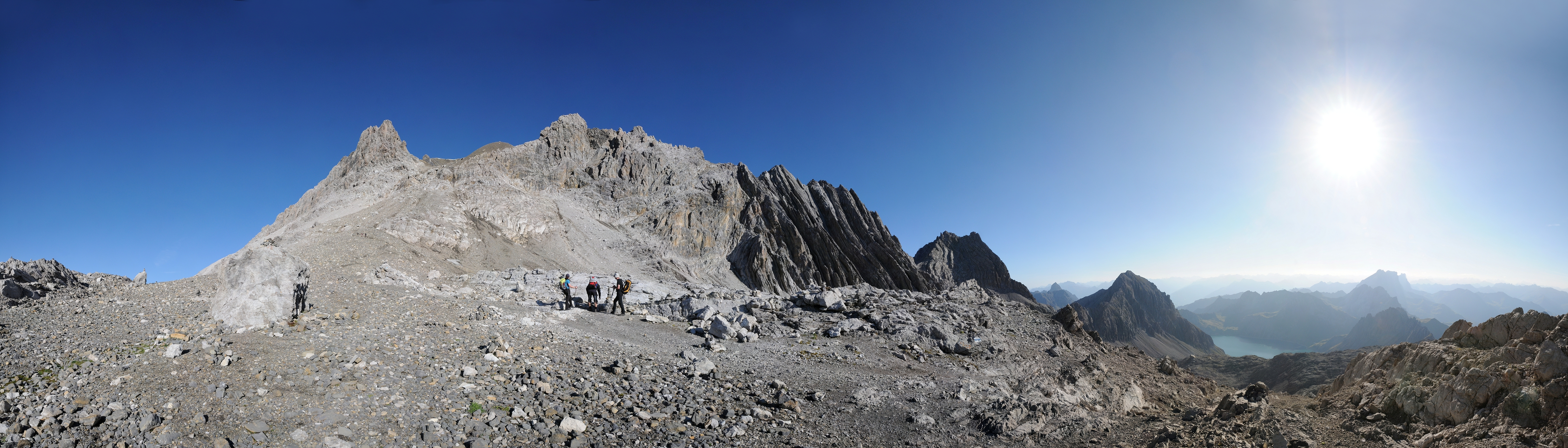
Panorama
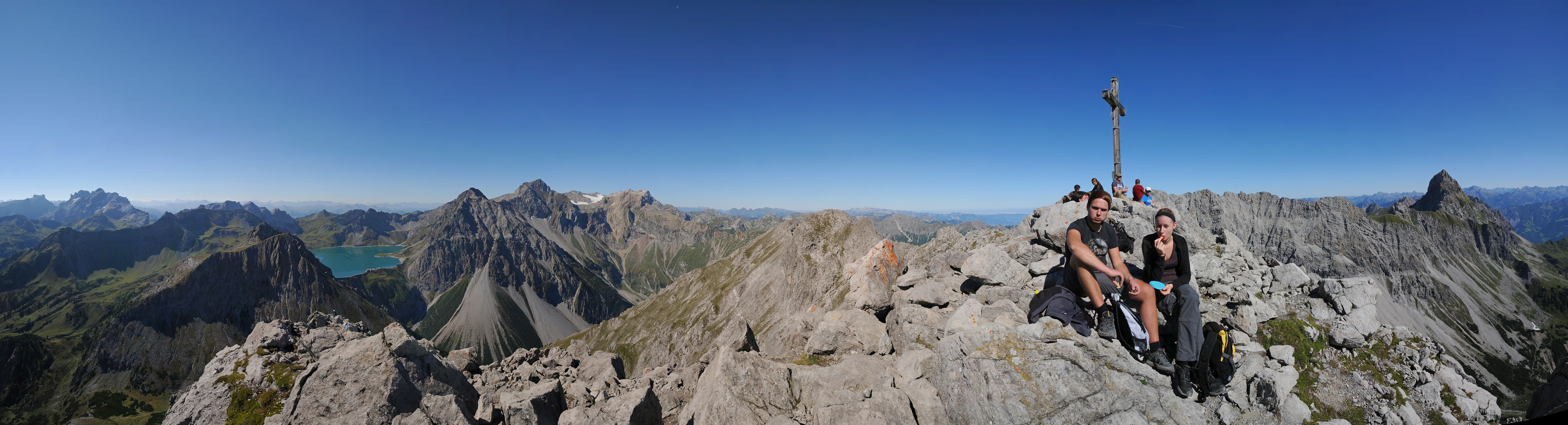
Panorama
