= Bertram Jäger =

Austrian politician (1929–2026)

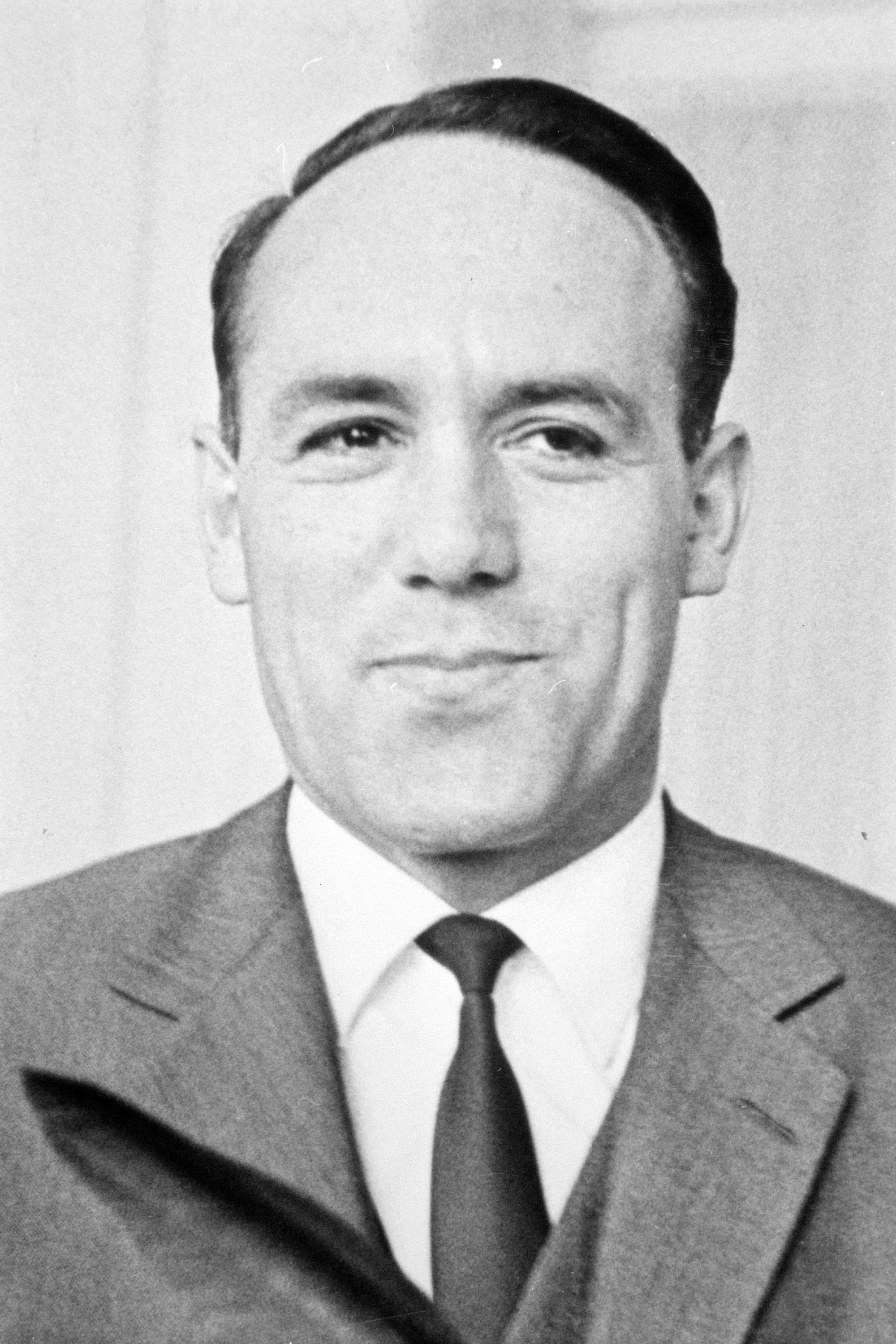
- Jäger in 1985

Member of the Landtag of Vorarlberg
- In office 29 October 1964 – 3 October 1994

Personal details
- Born: 22 October 1929 Bürs, Vorarlberg, Austria
- Died: 6 July 2026 (aged 96) Bludenz, Vorarlberg, Austria
- Party: ÖVP
- Education: Bundeshandelsakademie und Bundeshandelsschule Bregenz
- Occupation: Civil servant

Bertram Jäger (22 October 1929 – 6 July 2026) was an Austrian politician. A member of the Austrian People's Party, he served in the Landtag of Vorarlberg from 1964 to 1994.

Jäger died in Bludenz on 6 July 2026, at the age of 96.
