= Alpinale Short Film Festival =

- Location: Bludenz, Austria
- Founded: 1985
- Awards: Golden Unicorn
- Directors: Manuela Mylonas (since 2008)
- Festival date: August
- Language: German
- Website: https://alpinale.at

The Alpinale Short Film Festival (German: Alpinale Kurzfilmfestival) is a film festival in Bludenz, Vorarlberg (Austria). The short film festival draws around 1,000 visitors to Bludenz. Every year, about 30 hand-picked international short films are screened. The best films are awarded the Golden Unicorn.

From 1985 to 2002, the festival took place in Bludenz, and from 2003 to 2019 in Nenzing. From 2020 onwards, the festival was held in Bludenz again.

The film language of all short films at the Alpinale is played in the original sound. For foreign language films, subtitles are displayed, while some English films are only provided without subtitles.

== Related events ==
- Alpinale Ländle Tour: Every spring, the Alpinale tours through Vorarlberg with favorite short films from the audience and the jury of the past short film festival, and also stops in Switzerland and Vienna. A selected program of audience favorites, as well as short films awarded the Golden Unicorn, will be shown on a big screen.
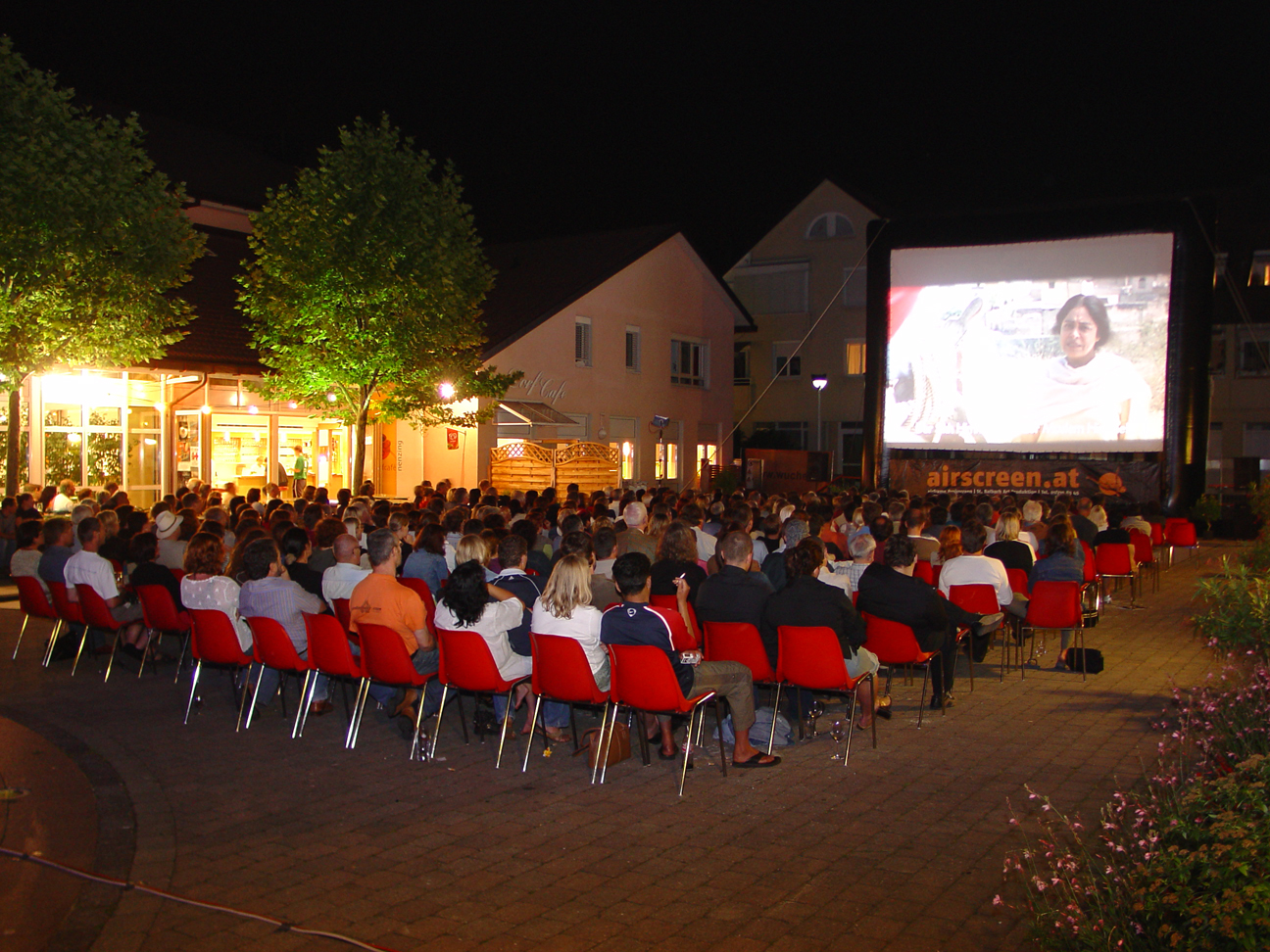
- Open air screening in Nenzing
  Vorarlberger Short Film Night: The Short Film Night has taken place every spring since 2010. All submitted Vorarlberg short films will be screened there and simultaneously publicly pre-judged for the festival in summer. The four finalists who compete in the "vorarlberg shorts" category at the Alpinale will be identified on the Vorarlberg Short Film Night.
- OBACHT! Horror Short Film Night: 14 horror themed short films are being screened at the Horror Short Film Night in autumn. The crowd may vote for the best film of the evening.
