= Brauerei Fohrenburg =

Brewery in Austria

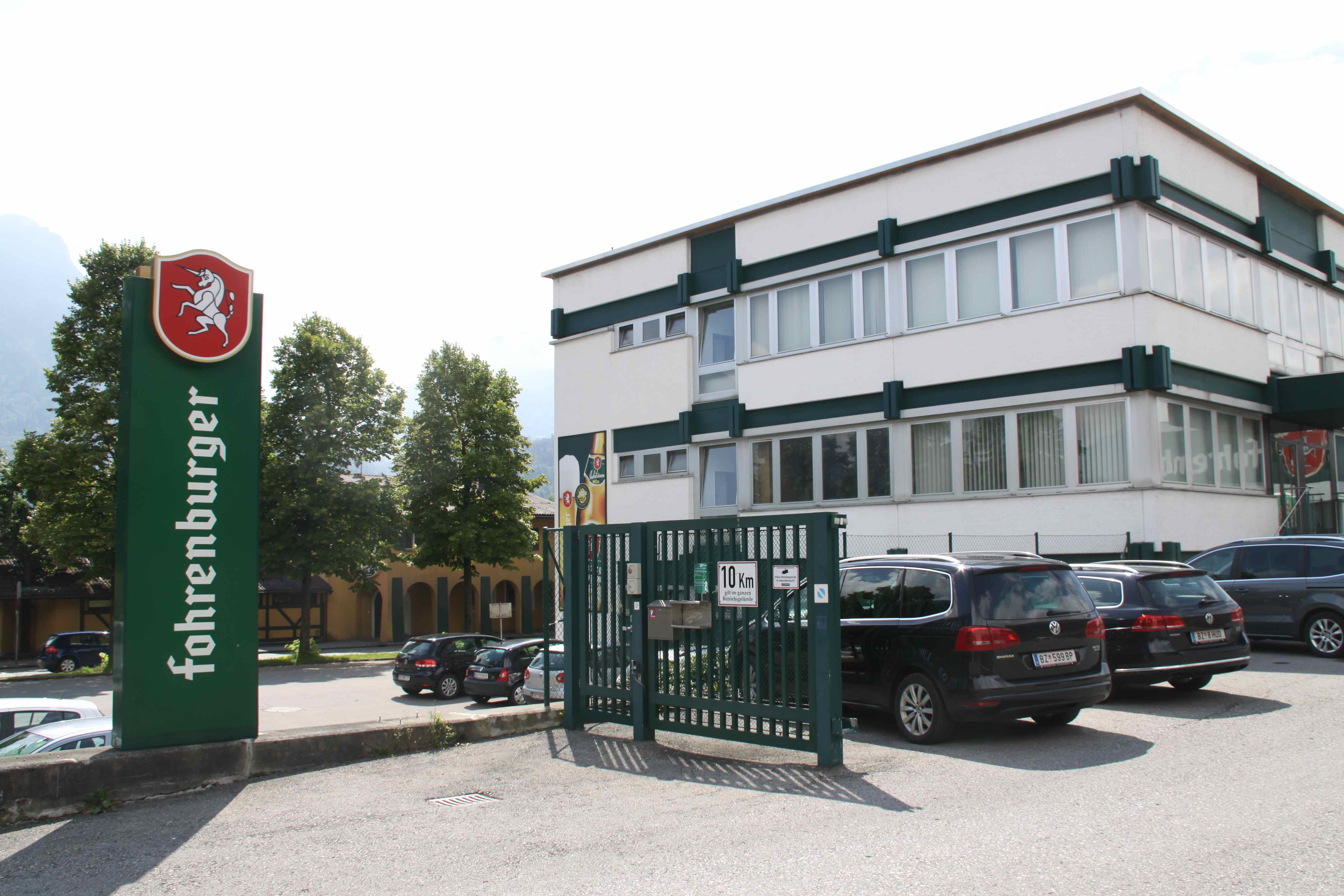
- The Fohrenburg brewery
- Location: Bludenz, Vorarlberg, Austria
- Opened: 1881
- Key people: Wolfgang Sila (managing director)
- Net income: c. €29 million (2019)
- Employees: 135 (2019)
- Website: www.fohrenburger.at

The Brauerei Fohrenburg is a brewery in Bludenz in Vorarlberg (Austria). It was established by Ferdinand Gassner in 1881.

== History ==
In 1881, the Fohrenburger site in Bludenz was able to produce 800,000 litres of Fohrenburger beer. In 1981, the amount of beer produced was 150,000 hectolitres (15 million litres), and in 2011, 193,000 hectolitres (19.3 million litres) of beer.

In 1998, the Fohrenburg brewery entered into a cooperation with Rauch Fruchtsäfte, a family-owned international operating fruit juice producer from Austria. In 2000, the brewery was acquired by Rauch.

On 1 May 2017, the Fohrenburg brewery and the beverage dealer s'Fäscht Wolfgang Sila GmbH officially merged.

In 2019, the Brau Union (an Austrian subcompany to the Heineken N.V.) has entered into agreements with which it increases its existing stake in the Fohrenburg Beteiligungs-AG from 11% to 74%.

Currently, the brewery operates three different sites: the main site in Bludenz, the original headquarters of s'Fäscht in Mäder and since 2012 a distribution warehouse in Schnann (Tyrol).

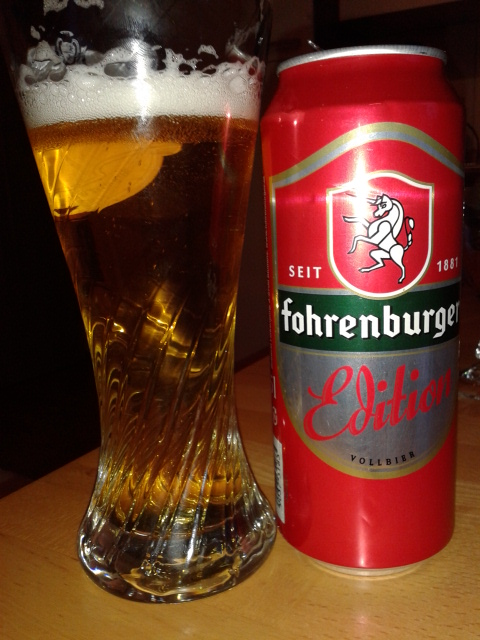
A glass and a can of Fohrenburger beer.

== Name and logo ==
The name of the brewery is derived from the "Badgasthof Fohrenburg", an inn neighbouring the brewery when it was founded it 1881.

The logo shows a white rising unicorn on a red shield. The unicorn has also been visible in the coat of arms of the city of Bludenz since 1929 and it embodies an ancient symbol of unrestrained strength, enduring strength and virgin purity. The brewery's logo with the associated lettering was designed by the artist and heraldist Konrad Honold (1918–2007).

== Beer brands ==
The product range includes nearly two dozen types of beer, beer-mixes, soft drinks and water. A total of 13 different beer specialties and 4 different types of lemonade are produced at the Bludenz location.

== Brewery Museum Fohrenburg ==
The Brewery Museum building, the old carpentry at the entrance to the brewery courtyard, is the oldest building of the Fohrenburg brewery. It dates back to 1881 and was formerly used as a workshop and later as a warehouse. The building was extensively renovated in 2014 and since then has offered space for the brewery museum, the brewery shop and beer tasting in the "Stuba Brewery".

The museum shows the career of the Fohrenburg brewery and beer brewing in Bludenz in general. Historical photographs, old beer bottles and labels, earlier advertising motifs and equipment for beer production allow a look back at more than 130 years of brewing history. Moreover, the history of the gastronomy in Bludenz since 1920 is told in many pictures in the museum.

Photos of the Brewery Museum Fohrenburg

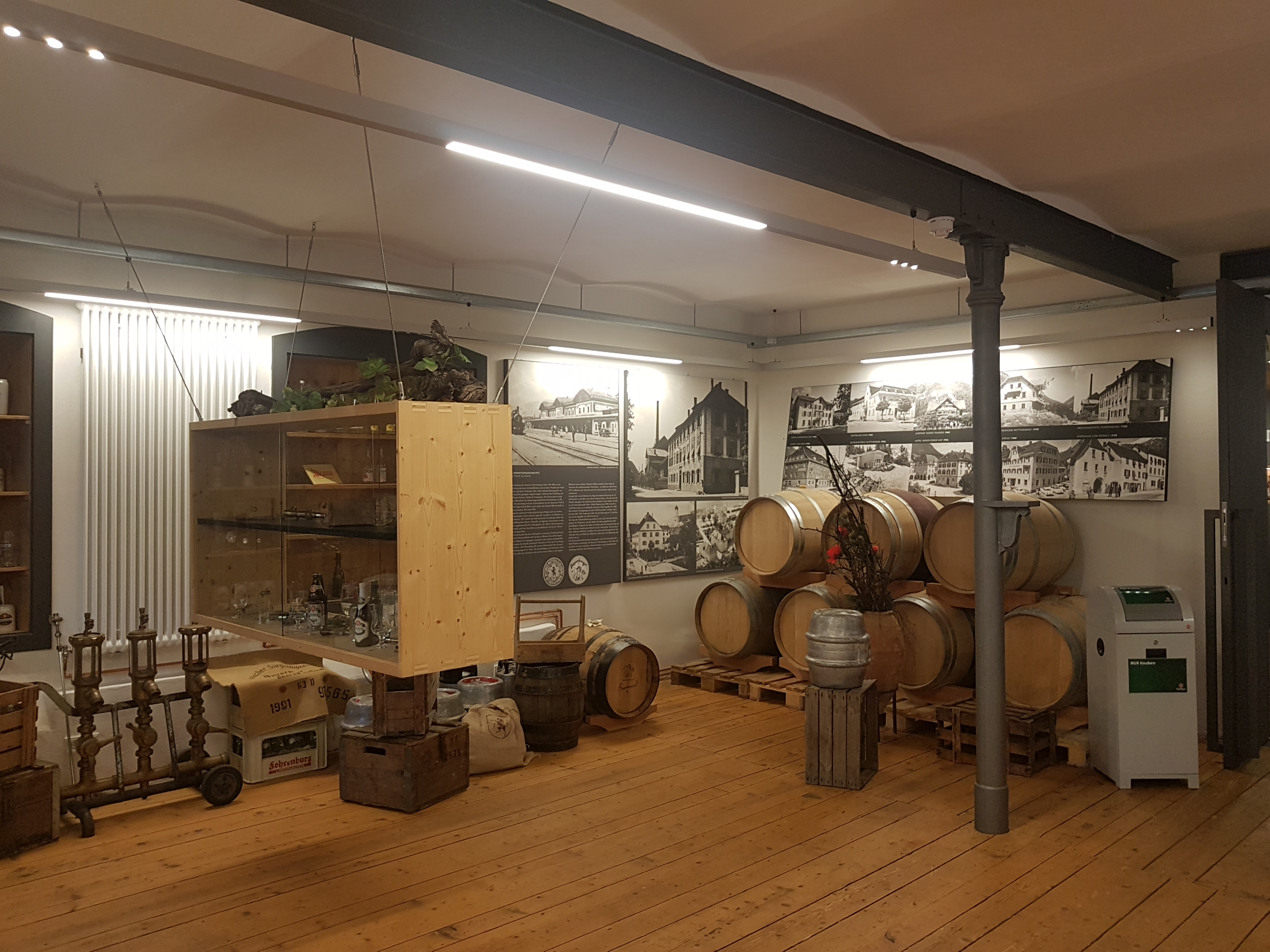

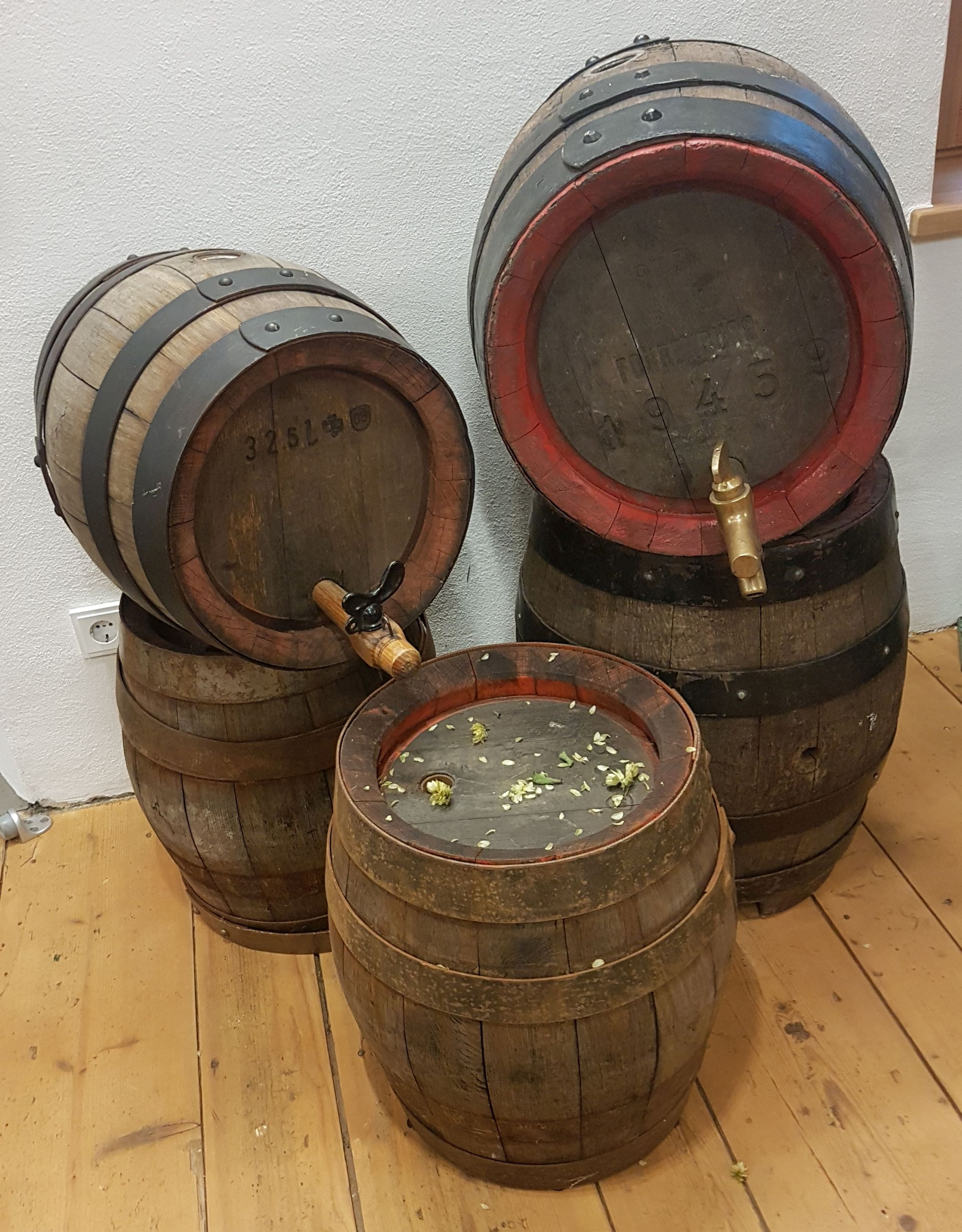

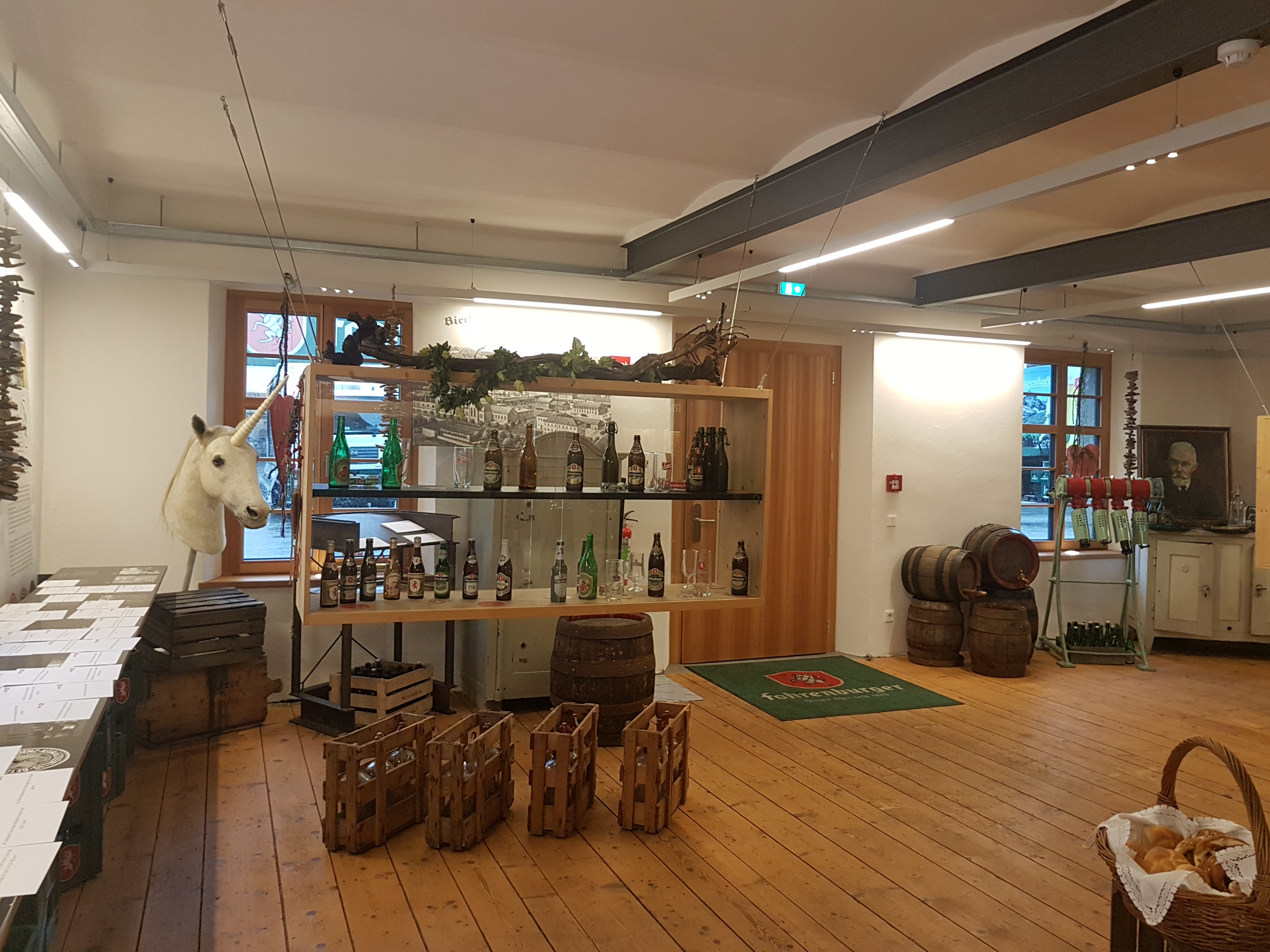

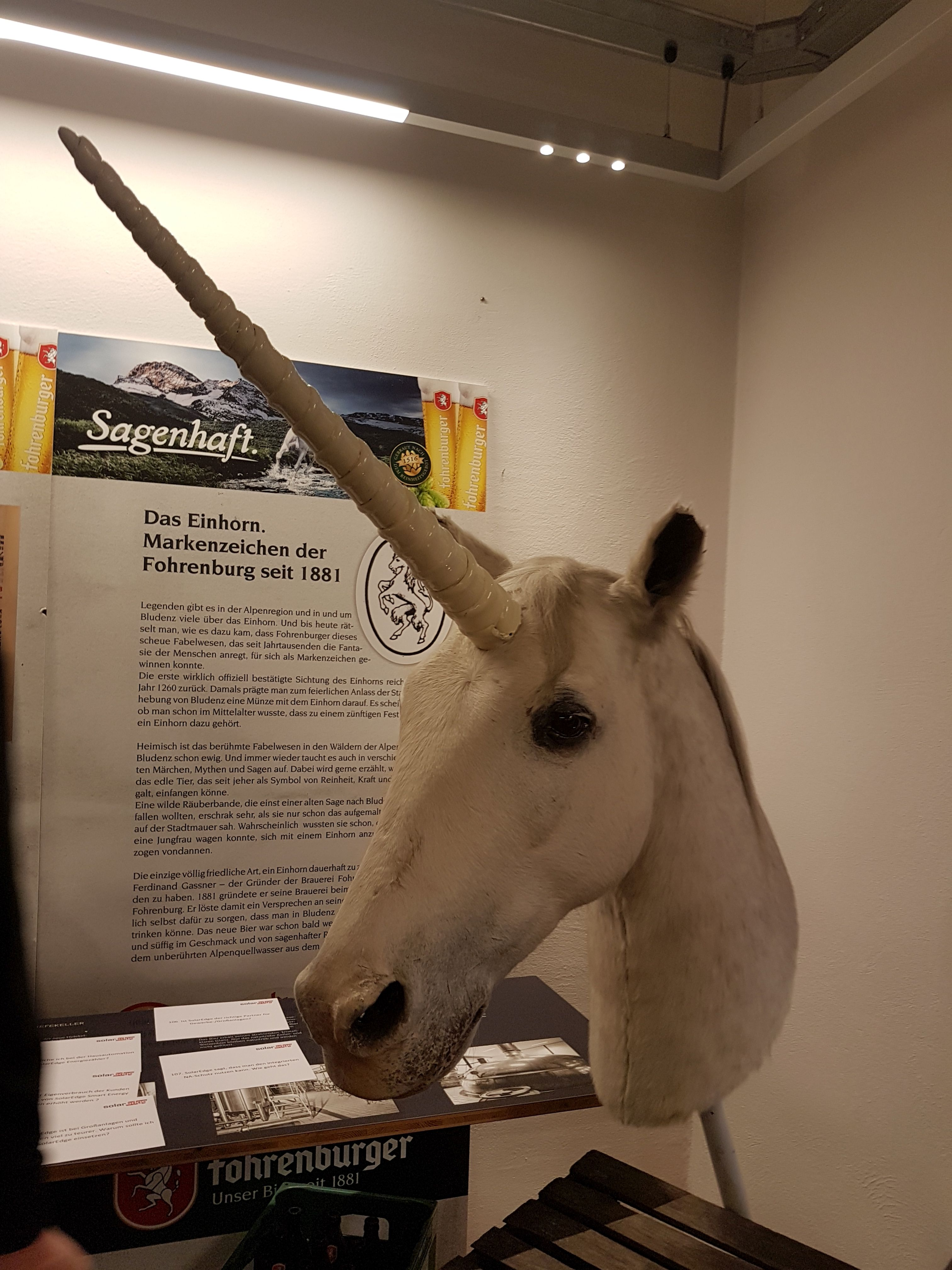

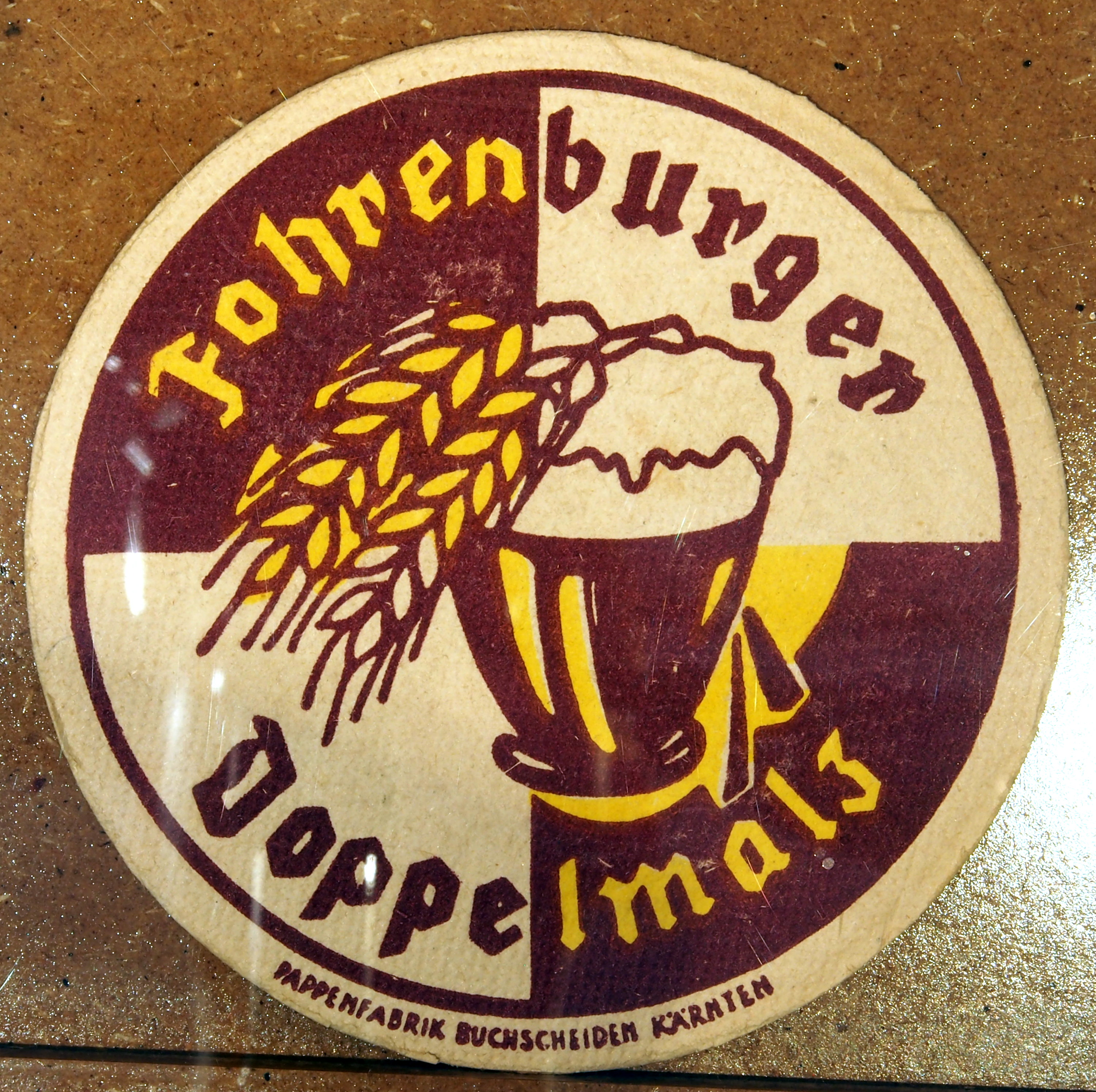

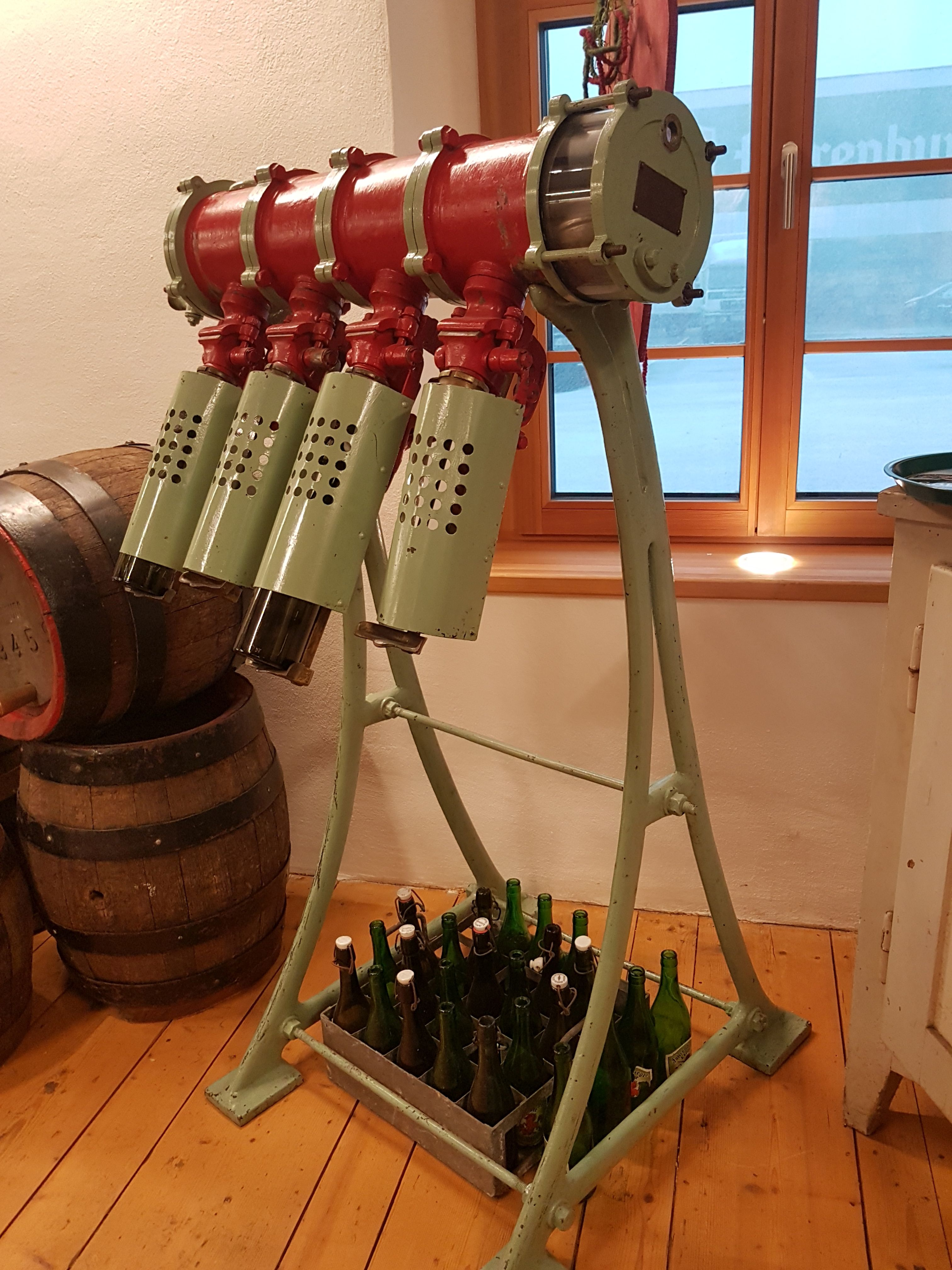
