= 1919 Vorarlberg annexation referendum =

Austrian state vote to join Switzerland

- 11 May 1919
- Do the people of Vorarlberg wish the Landesrat to announce the Vorarlberg people's intent to join the Swiss Confederation and to enter into negotiations with the Swiss federal government?
- Outcome: Referendum successful; failure to unite

Results
| Choice | Votes | % |
|---|---|---|
| Yes | 48,302 | 80.70% |
| No | 11,552 | 19.30% |
- Results by municipality

A referendum on whether the Provisional Provincial Assembly of Vorarlberg should announce the intention of the people of Vorarlberg to join the Swiss Confederation and to enter into negotiations with the Swiss Federal Government was held on 11 May 1919. The proposal received substantial support, with 80.7% of voters and a majority in 93 out of 96 municipalities voting in favour.

Opinions on the integration of Vorarlberg, a predominantly Catholic and rural region with a concentrated industrial sector, into the Swiss Confederation were mixed. A petition for a popular initiative for union failed and only one member of the seven-person Swiss Federal Council, Foreign Affairs Minister Felix Calonder, strongly endorsed the idea. The Swiss government did, however, provide aid to the region, allowing the local government to avoid a serious famine.

The Treaty of Saint-Germain-en-Laye, signed on 10 September 1919, made no provision for a plebiscite in Vorarlberg and with no support from any outside power, the province was to remain with Austria as the independence of Austria was "inalienable otherwise than with the consent of the Council of the League of Nations."

== Background ==
The idea of Swiss annexation of Vorarlberg wasn't new. In 1798, the newly formed Helvetic Republic entered into an alliance treaty with France, which included a secret clause stipulating that several territories, including Vorarlberg, would be annexed to Helvetia with French assistance. This move aimed to round off Switzerland's eastern border. French Foreign Minister Talleyrand emphasised France's interest in this for economic, geographical, and military reasons.

However, by the summer of 1801, nothing had come out of it and First Consul Napoleon Bonaparte believed that circumstances did not allow him to help Switzerland acquire Vorarlberg. The situation in Switzerland was too confusing for Napoleon and the Treaty of Lunéville had ended the war against the Holy Roman Empire and Austria.

120 years later, on 3 November 1918, following the collapse of Austria-Hungary, the Provisional Provincial Assembly of Vorarlberg declared the region's succession from its union with Tyrol and the formation of an independent country within the framework of the German-Austrian state.

The movement for a referendum for union with Switzerland began around the same time with Ferdinand Riedmann, a trained teacher, cinema owner, conservative, and member of the Linz Soldier Soviet of the Common Army. In a speech to his comrades, he advocated for the union of Vorarlberg with Switzerland, and shortly after the Armistice of Villa Giusti, returned to his home province.

With the support of local craftsmen, tradesmen, small entrepreneurs, farmers, and petit bourgeois intelligentsia, Riedmann founded the committee to Campaign for Union with Switzerland on 13 November 1918. Amid an uncertain future of Austria following the collapse of Austria-Hungary, widespread economic hardship, and a prevailing sense of neglect by the government in Vienna, many in Vorarlberg viewed Switzerland as a place that offered employment and economic stability. Riedmann also praised the Swiss model of democracy and believed that Vorarlberg shared closer ties in terms of language, culture, lifestyle, and mindset with Switzerland than with the rest of Austria. In its campaigning the group employed anti-semitic rhetoric, referring to Austria as the "Jewish State of Vienna" and saying that they did "not want to know anything about the Jews of Vienna."

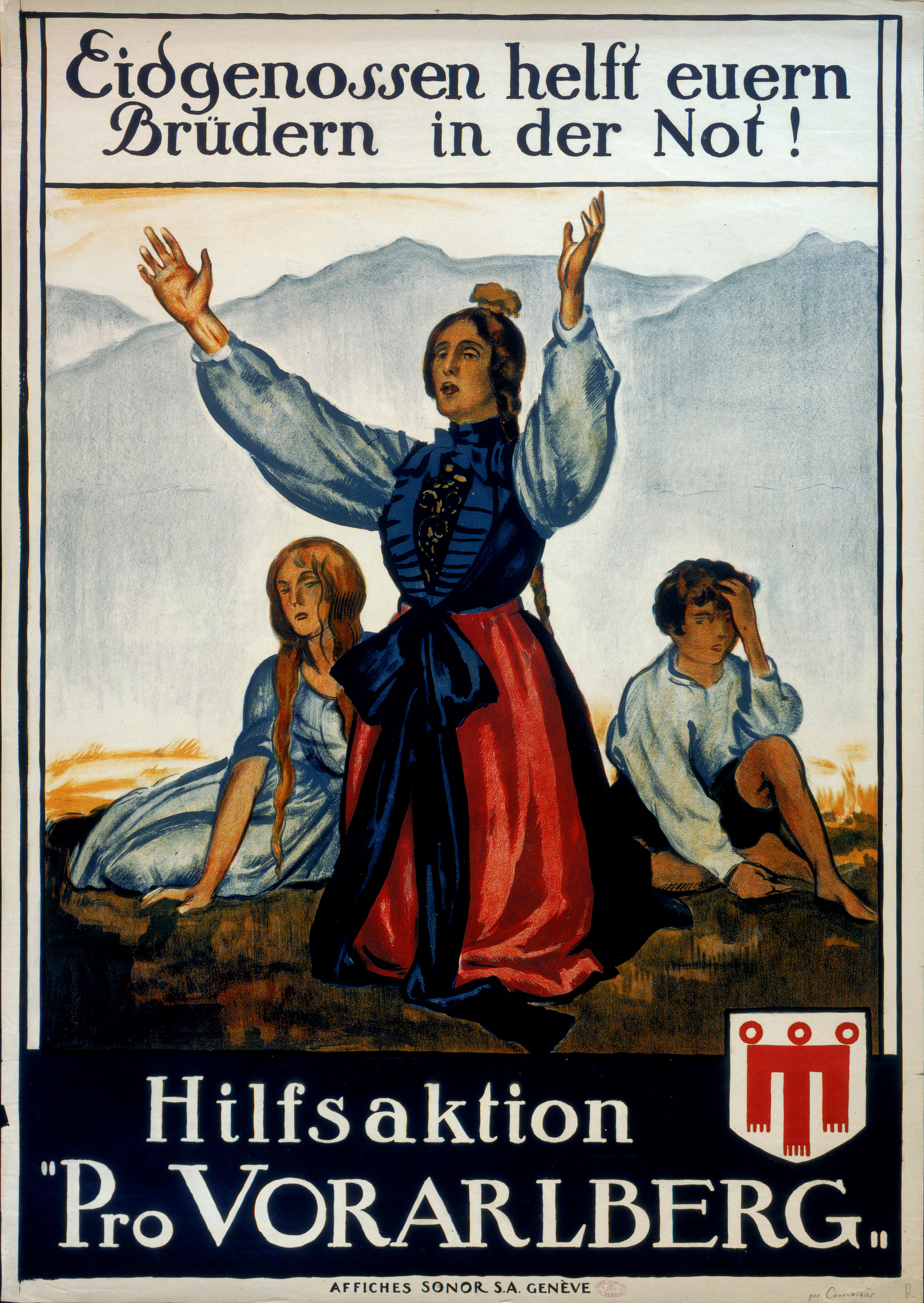
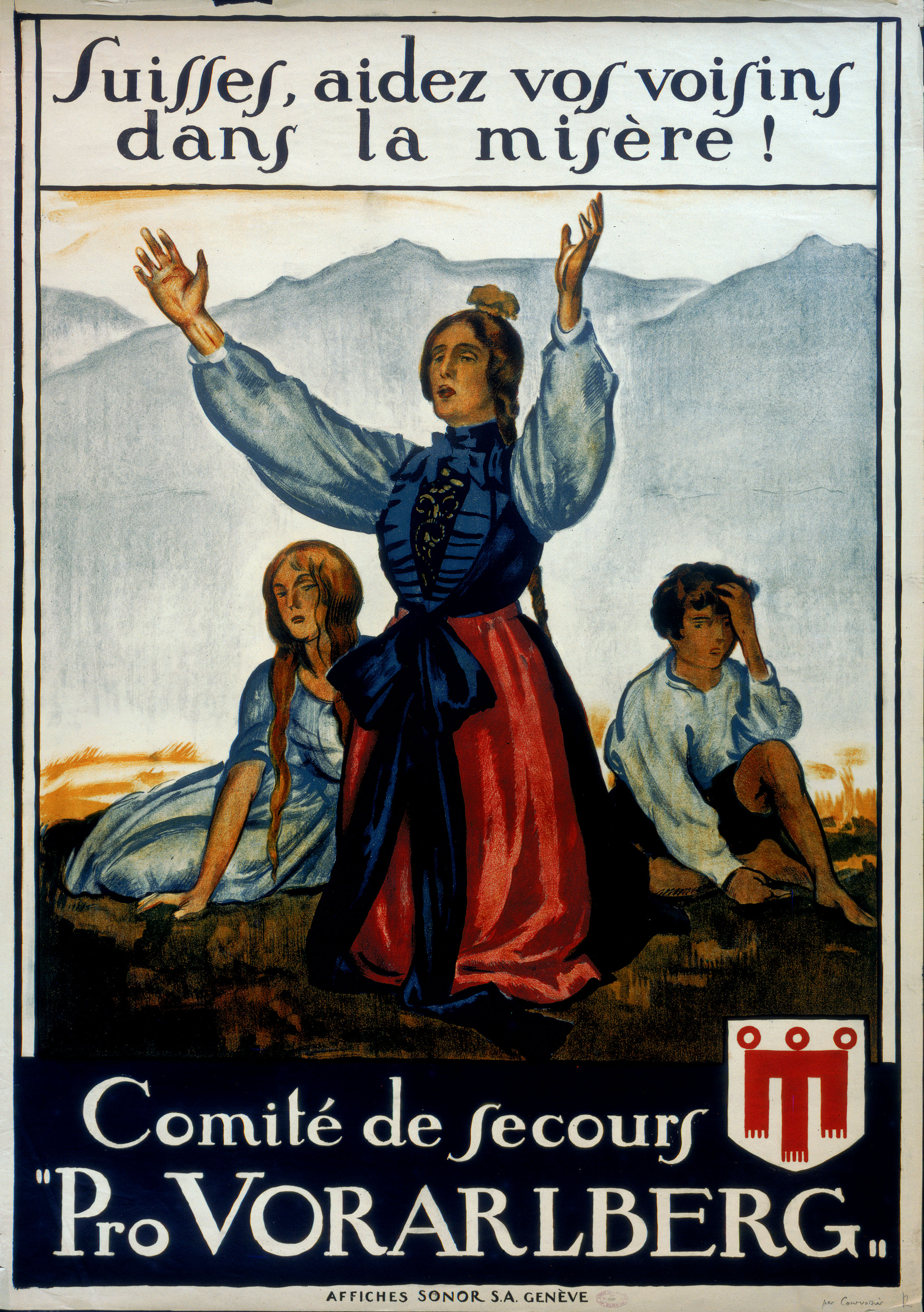
"Confederates, help your brothers in need", poster of the Swiss Pro Vorarlberg aid campaign, 1919

Between its founding and February 1919, the group collected signatures from 71% of the Vorarlberg electorate in favour of union with Switzerland. On 1 March, Riedmann passed the signatures to the then Christian Social Party lead provincial assembly, which on 15 March declared that its affiliation with German-Austria was to be regarded as provisional only and that a plebiscite should determine any union with a larger state, including a possible option for union with Bavaria or Württemberg. Provincial Governor Otto Ender, while leaning towards remaining in German-Austria, commented that:

I am of the opinion that, when we look at our geographical position, it is obvious that we are open towards Switzerland, not closed off from Germany, but definitely cut off by mountains from German-Austria.

In Switzerland, the opinions on the integration of Vorarlberg, a predominantly Catholic and rural region with a concentrated industrial sector, into the Swiss Confederation were mixed. A group of conservatives such as Gonzague de Reynold supported the idea and founded the Pro Vorarlberg movement. Its goal was to collect 50,000 signatures for a popular initiative for a union. The group was only able to collect 29,000 signatures and only one member of the seven-person Swiss Federal Council, Foreign Affairs Minister Felix Calonder, strongly endorsed the idea. While German-speaking Swiss Catholics were in support of union, French-speaking Swiss and Ticino Swiss feared that Vorarlberg's accession would shift the balance of languages, religions, and parties of the country.

Opposition to the union also came from the Labour Party, Liberal Party, wealthy individuals, Social Democratic Party, German Freedom Party, Pan-German Party, and representatives of the textile and wood industries. The latter five instead advocated for union with Germany or the establishment of a Swabian state with Württemberg, creating the Vorarlberg Swabian Chapter in April 1919. They saw Switzerland as a free vassal of France and a place where too many Jews were in charge. Socialists, on the other hand, hoped that joining Germany would lead to a continuation of the revolution and the transformation of society.

== Results ==
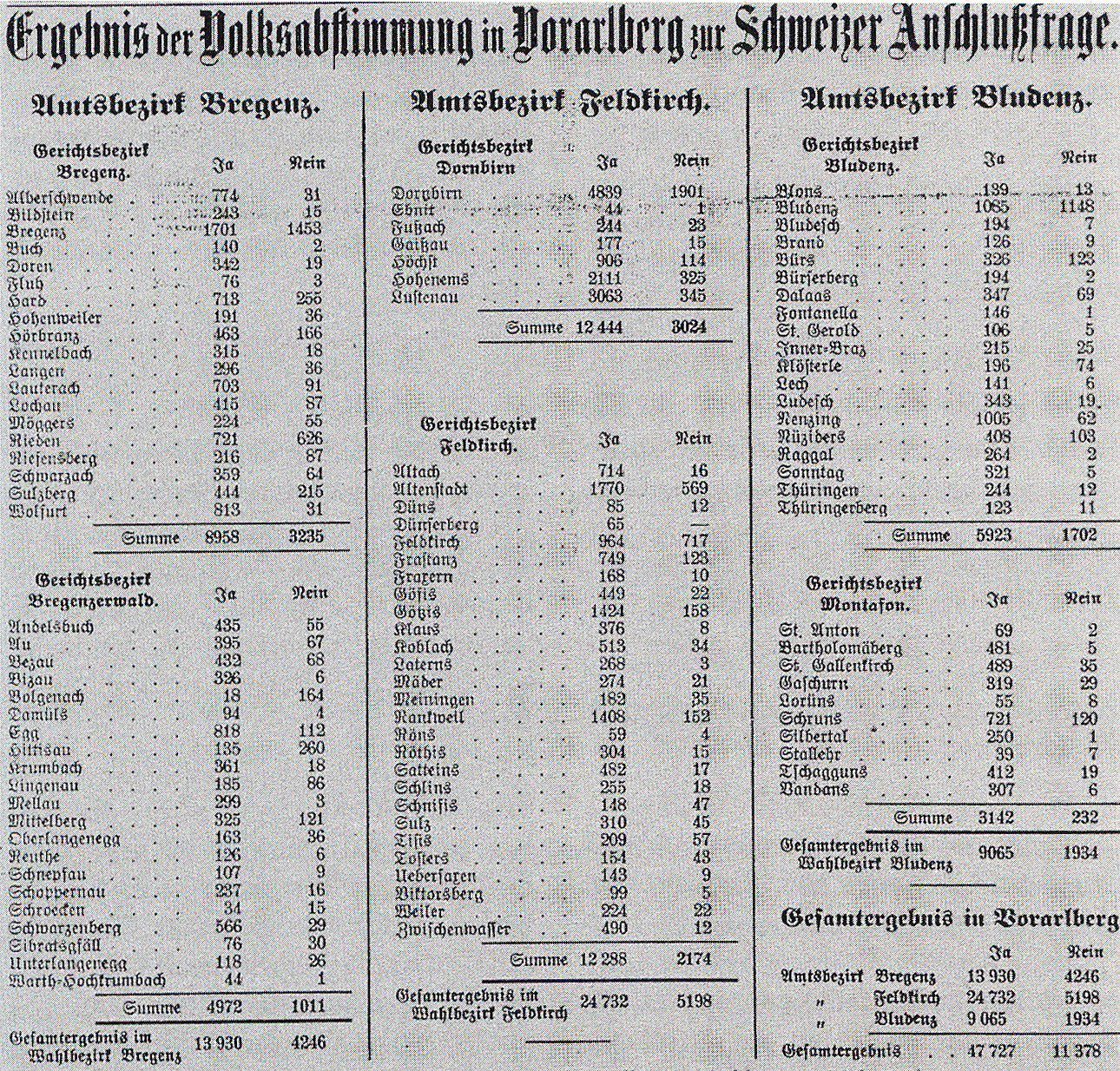
Result of the Vorarlberg referendum, published in the Vorarlberger Tagblatt on 14 May 1919

The referendum was held on May 11 and showed that 80.7% of voters and a majority in 93 out of 96 municipalities voting in favour. The only municipalities with a majority opposing the proposal were Bludenz, Hittisau and Bolgenach, which today is a part of Hittisau. The exact numbers for the referendum have been contradicted by several sources due to errors in the transmission of results from several municipalities, leading to manual corrections of previously printed announcements. According to Ulrich Nachbaur, head of the Vorarlberg State Archives, the final count was 48,302 yes and 11,552 no.

| Choice | Votes | % |
|---|---|---|
| For | 48,302 | 80.70 |
| Against | 11,552 | 19.30 |
| Total | 59,854 | 100.00 |
| Registered voters/turnout | 70,505 | – |
Source: Greber

== Aftermath ==
At the Paris Peace Conference, the Vorarlberg question was treated as a secondary matter, despite the presence of Provincial Governor Ender with the Austrian delegation. Ender participated as a representative of Vorarlberg but was only considered an expert with internal say. The authority to raise the Vorarlberg question to the Allied powers rested solely with Austrian Chancellor Karl Renner and a few of his close advisers, who aimed to prevent the loss of any province. Switzerland refrained from expressing support for Vorarlberg's desire for union to the Allied powers as the Swiss Federal Council did not want to interfere in another state's internal affairs and force a secession, and although the French initially showed some willingness to agree, they ultimately opposed the union. The Treaty of Saint-Germain-en-Laye, signed on 10 September 1919, made no provision for a plebiscite in Vorarlberg and with no support from any outside power, the province was to remain with Austria as the independence of Austria was "inalienable otherwise than with the consent of the Council of the League of Nations."

While the Swiss government never expressed support for union, the Swiss government did, however, provide aid to the region, allowing the local government to avoid a serious famine. Campaigning for the cause would continue into the mid-1920s in both Austria and Switzerland but would eventually die out. Efforts by the people of Vorarlberg to get the League of Nations to agree to a union with Switzerland were also failures.
