= Bludenz =

Bludenz Bludaz
- Municipality
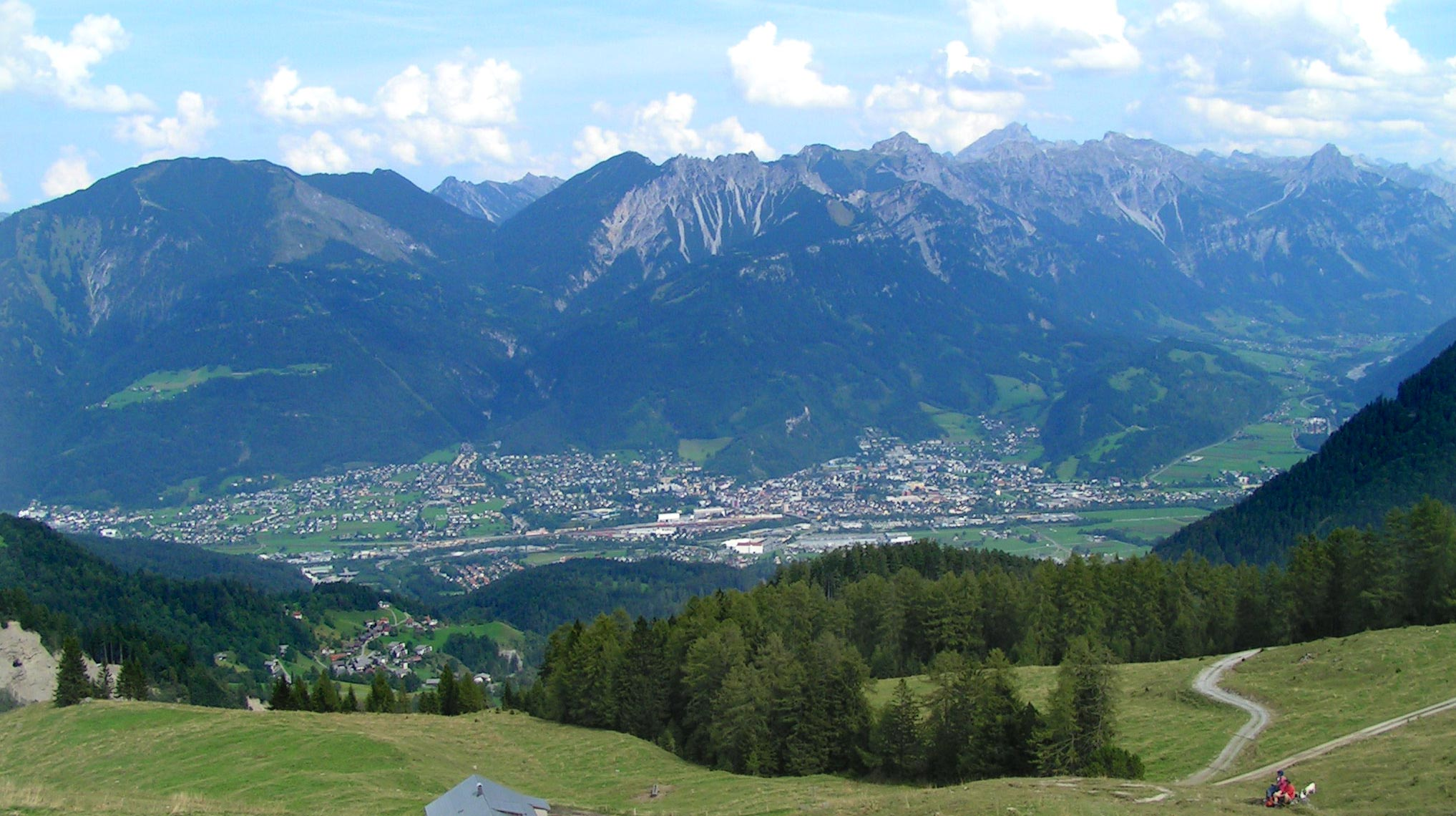
- View from southwest

- Coat of arms

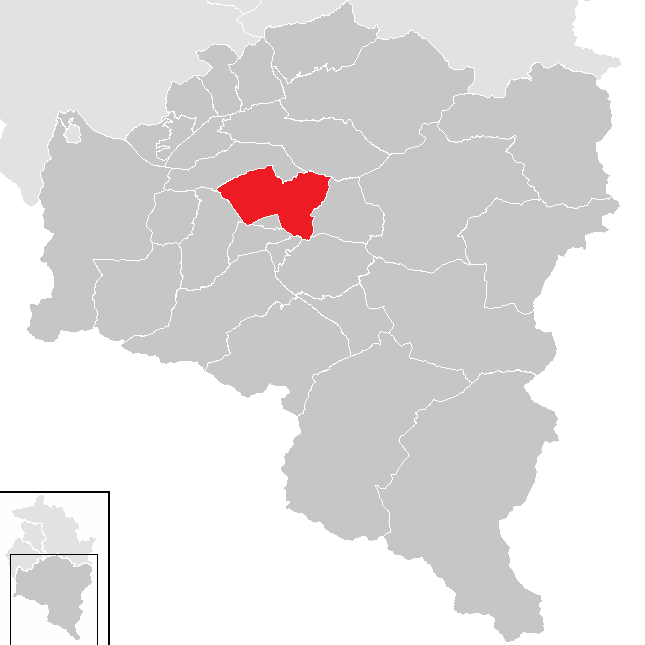
- Location in the district

- Location within Austria
- Coordinates: 47°08′00″N 09°49′00″E
- Country: Austria
- State: Vorarlberg
- District: Bludenz

Government
  - Mayor: Simon Tschann (ÖVP)

Area
  - Total: 29.92 km^{2} (11.55 sq mi)
- Elevation: 588 m (1,929 ft)
- Time zone: UTC+1 (CET)
  - Summer (DST): UTC+2 (CEST)
- Postal code: 6700
- Area code: 05552
- Vehicle registration: BZ
- Website: Official website

Bludenz (German pronunciation: [ˈbluːdɛnt͡s]; Alemannic: Bludaz) is a town in the westernmost Austrian state of Vorarlberg. It is the administrative seat of the Bludenz District, which encompasses about half of Vorarlberg's territory. As of January 2025, Bludenz had a population of 15,102.

== Geography ==
The town is located on the Ill River, a direct tributary of the Rhine. It is surrounded by the ranges of the Bregenz Forest Mountains in the north, and by the Rätikon and Silvretta ranges in the south. Bludenz lies at the meeting point of five valleys: Walgau and Montafon (Ill), Brandnertal, Klostertal up to Arlberg Pass, and Großes Walsertal.

Bludenz is a popular starting point for hiking and mountain-biking in spring, summer, and autumn. It is located not far from many skiing resorts (e.g., Brand and Lech).

Major companies are Mondelēz International (Milka chocolate) and the Fohrenburg brewery which was established in 1881.

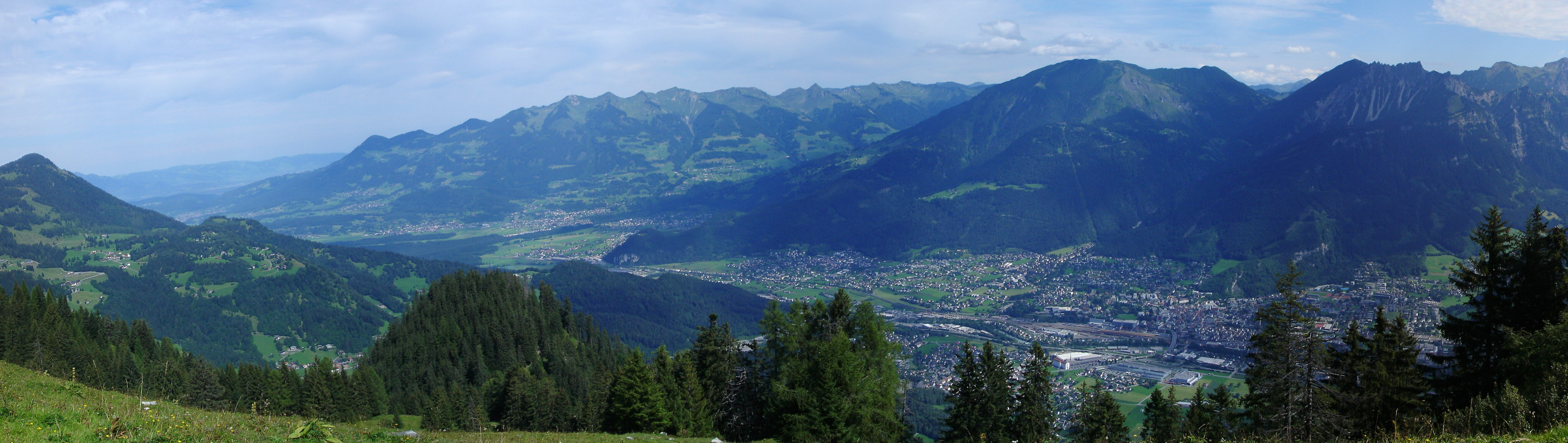

== History ==
Archaeological finds indicate that settlement in the area of Bludenz began in the Bronze Age, and continued throughout the La Tène era.

Bludenz itself was first mentioned in the year 830 CE in an urbarium of the Raetian estates within the Carolingian Empire. The town was established by the comital Werdenberg dynasty; town privileges were granted in 1274. A stay by the Habsburg Duke Frederick IV of Austria, who had just received an imperial ban at the Council of Constance, is documented from 30 March 1416. Four years later, Bludenz passed into the Further Austrian possessions of the Habsburg dynasty.

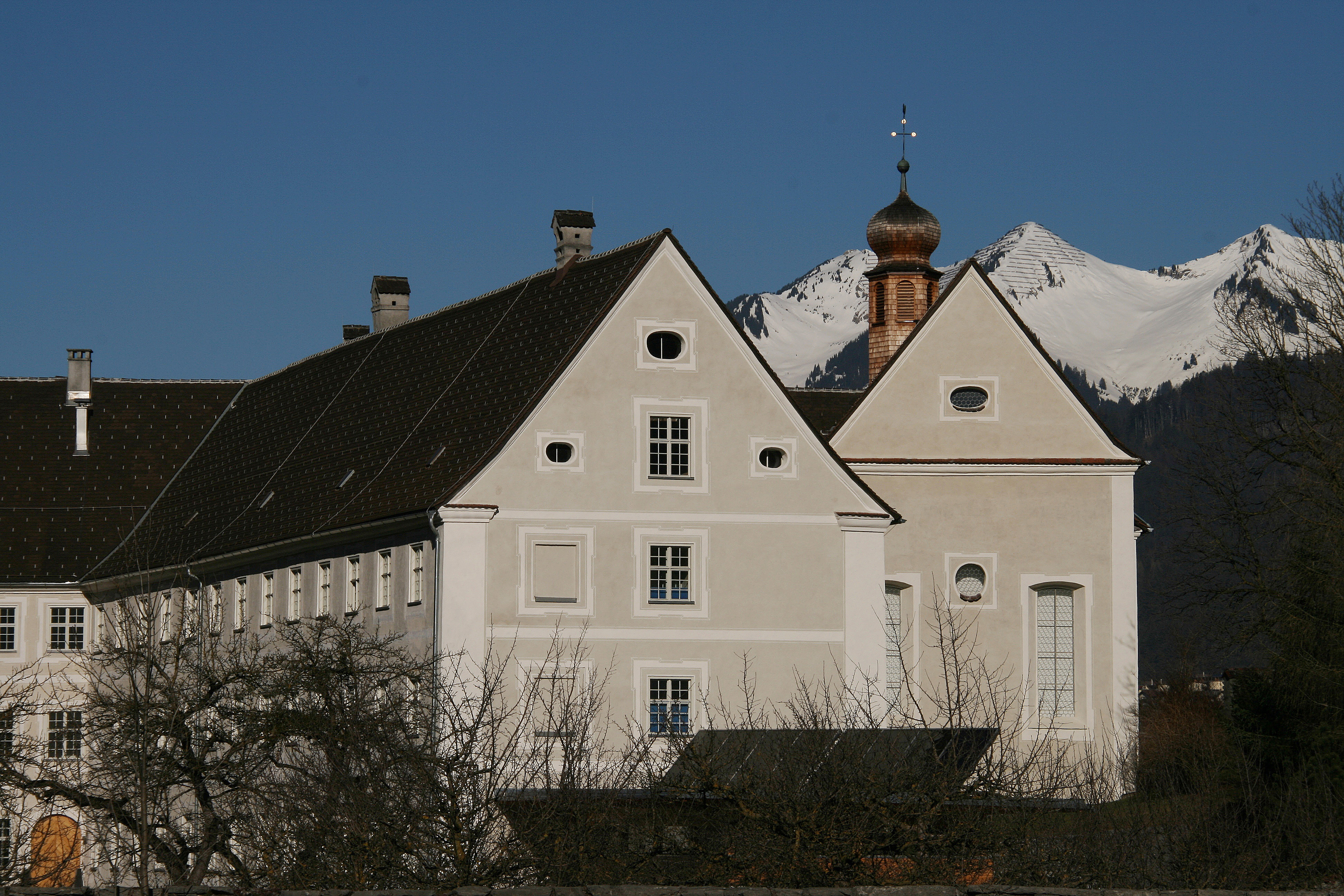
Priory of St. Peter in Bludenz

The Bludenz district headquarters are situated in the Castle of Gayenhofen, built in the 18th century.

In 1873, the German and Austrian Alpine Club was created in a merger between the German Alpine Club and the Austrian Alpine Club in the former shooting lodge next to Gayenhofen Castle.

At the end of World War One, the region voted against joining Switzerland in the 1919 Vorarlberg annexation referendum, being one of only three municipalities to do so.

After the Anschluss, the region became part of Reichsgau Tirol-Vorarlberg. The South Tyrol Option Agreement lead to a large influx of South-Tyrolers into the region, and as a result, new accommodation was built for those moving to the region.

In 1943, the tower of the Church of the Holy Cross was used as an aerial observation post, with an air station being built on Mutterberg. Anti-air guns were mounted in the Bludenz train station and the Bürs substation. French troops liberated the region in May 1945 and remained until the end of Allied-occupied Austria.

== Education ==
High schools in Blundenz include Bundesgymnasium und Bundesrealgymnasium Bludenz.

== Transport ==
The nearest airports to the town are:

- St. Gallen–Altenrhein Airport (57 km north west)
- Zurich Airport (154 km north west)

== Culture ==
The Alpinale Short Film Festival was founded in 1985 in Bludenz. In August, around 40 international short films are shown to a crowd of 1,000 visitors. Related events are the Alpinale Ländle Tour, the Vorarlberger Short Film Night, and the Horror Short Film Night in autumn. The festival has taken place in Bludenz from 1985 to 2002, and from 2020 onwards. Between 2003 and 2019, it was held in Nenzing.

The Brewery Museum Fohrenburg displays the development of the Fohrenburg brewery and beer brewing in Bludenz in general. Historical photographs, old beer bottles and labels, earlier advertising motifs and equipment for beer production allow a look back at more than 130 years of Fohrenburg's brewing history.

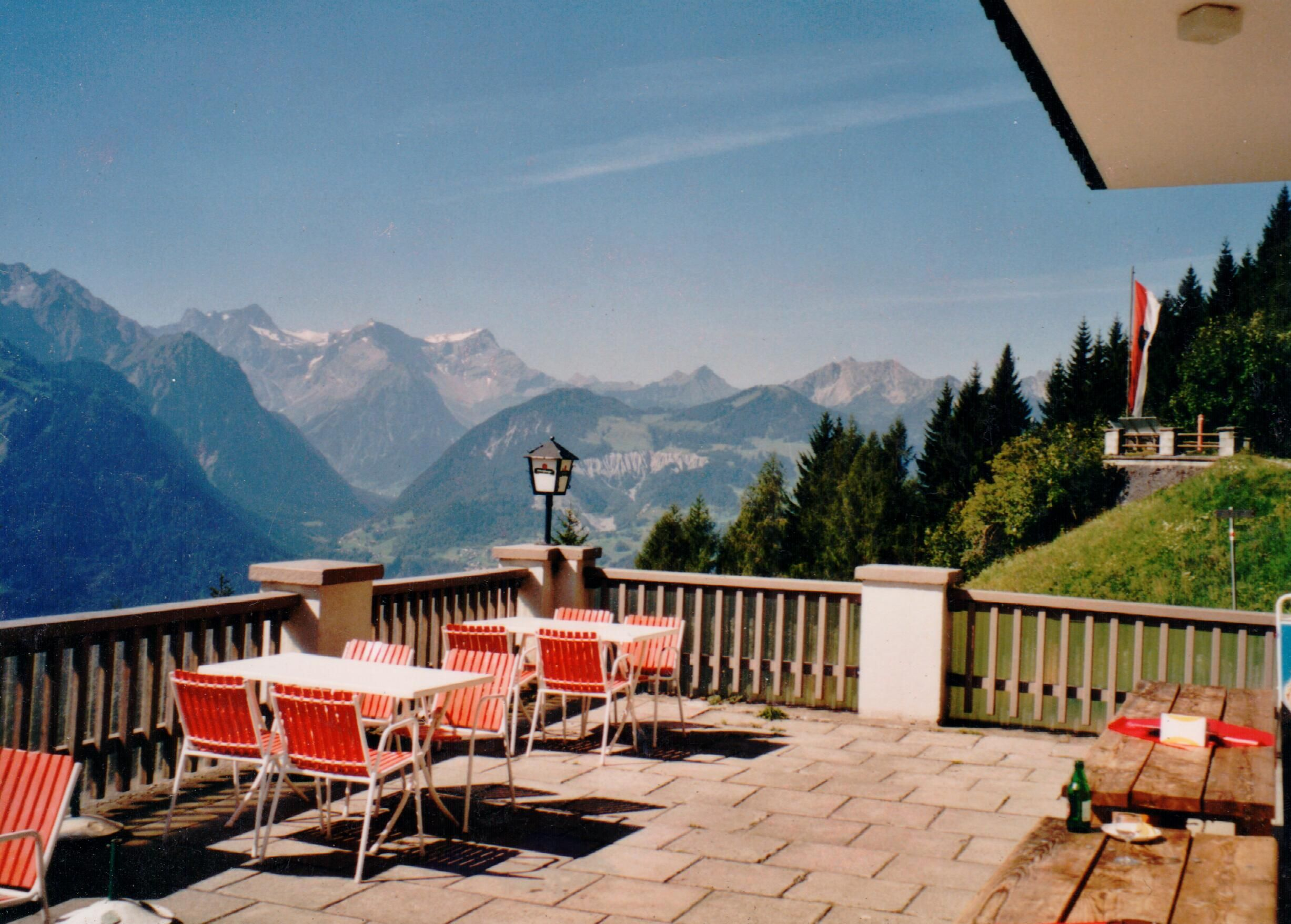
Restaurant Muttersberg at the Muttersberg in Bludenz, Vorarlberg (2000). In the background the beginning of the Brandnertal.

The Bludenzer Tage zeitgemäßer Musik is an international contemporary music festival annually held in autumn/winter. It was founded by Hans Peter Frick, later artistic directors were Georg Friedrich Haas, Wolfram Schurig and Alexander Moosbrugger and the young Italian composer, Clara Iannotta, who been responsible for the programme since 2014. Over the years, more than 100 world premieres have been performed in Bludenz.

== Demographics ==
Historical population
Year	Pop.	±%
1869	2,466	—
1880	3,151	+27.8%
1890	4,501	+42.8%
1900	5,361	+19.1%
1910	5,870	+9.5%
1923	6,019	+2.5%
1934	7,738	+28.6%
1939	7,738	+0.0%
1951	10,178	+31.5%
1961	11,127	+9.3%
1971	12,273	+10.3%
1981	12,891	+5.0%
1991	13,369	+3.7%
2001	13,701	+2.5%
2011	13,726	+0.2%
2021	14,961	+9.0%
2026	14,994	+0.2%

Largest groups of foreign residents
Nationality	Population (2026)
Turkey	673
Germany	587
Syria	520
Bosnia and Herzegovina	358
Romania	260
Bulgaria	245
Croatia	220
Afghanistan	212
Hungary	150
Serbia	110
Russian Federation	104
Ukraine	101
Poland	78
Italy	67
Kosovo	54
Slovenia	53
Slovakia	43
Iraq	34
Czech Republic	24
Iran	14
North Macedonia	5

== Notable people ==
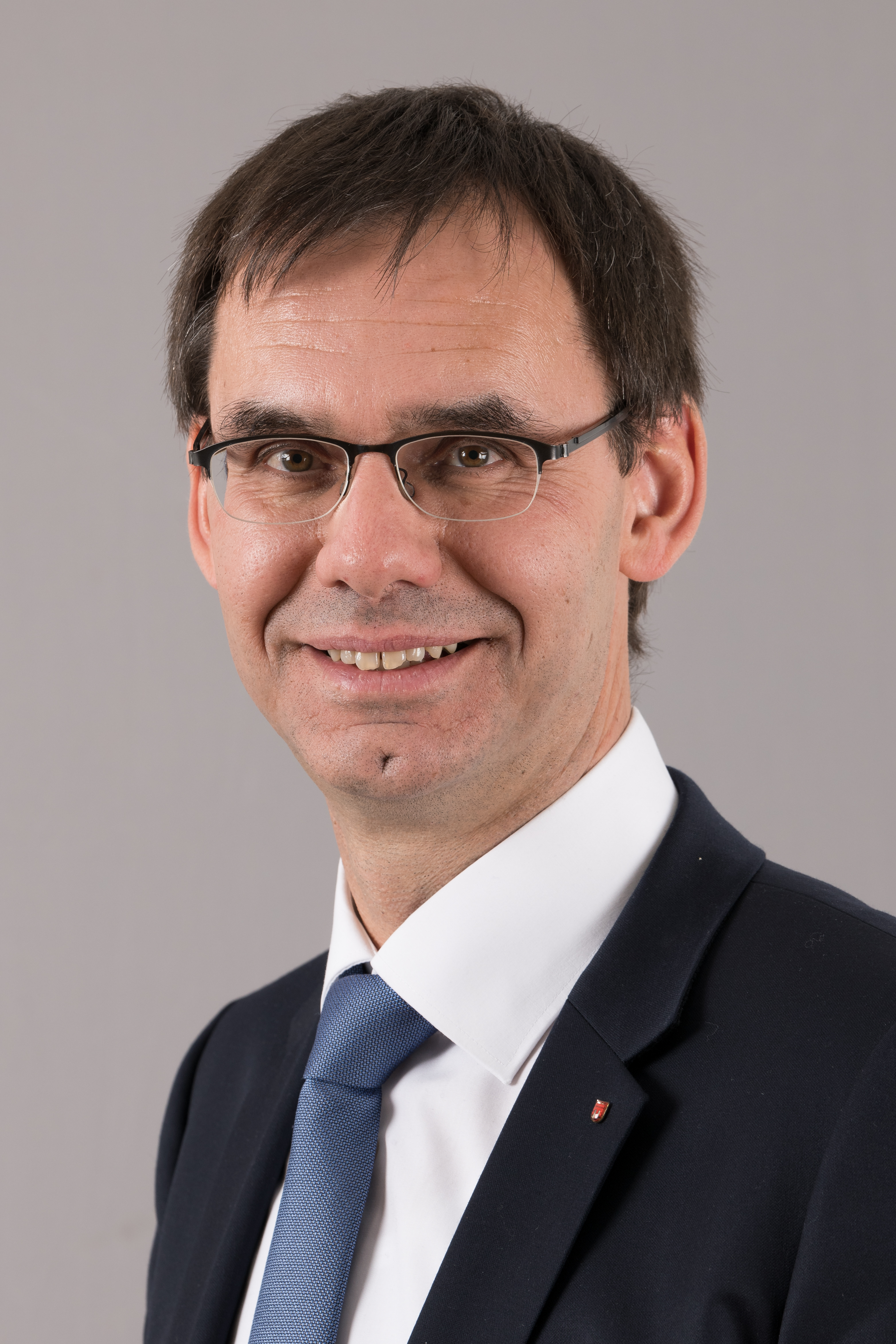
Markus Wallner, 2017

- Bertram Batlogg (born 1950), an Austrian physicist, researches high-temperature superconductivity
- Herbert Willi (born 1956), an Austrian composer of classical music
- Robert Rollinger (born 1964), an ancient historian and Assyriologist, worked on Herodotus
- Markus Wallner (born 1967), an Austrian politician (ÖVP) and governor of Vorarlberg.

=== Sport ===
- Dietmar Berchtold (born 1974), an Austrian football midfielder, played over 370 games
- Dursun Karatay (born 1984), an Austrian football player who has played over 250 games
- Johannes Strolz (born 1992), alpine ski racer, won two gold and one silver medal at the 2022 Winter Olympics
- Seifedin Chabbi (born 1993), an Austrian footballer who has played over 260 games
- Marco Stark (born 1993), an Austrian former footballer who played over 290 games

== Transport ==
There are three active railway stations in Bludenz: Bludenz railway station (the main railway station) located on the intersection of the Vorarlberg Railway, Arlberg Railway and Bludenz–Schruns railway (Montafonerbahn) lines, and Bludenz-Moos railway station and Brunnenfeld-Stallehr railway station, both located on the Bludenz–Schruns railway line. The stations are served by the S4 regional train service of the Vorarlberg S-Bahn. Bludenz station is the southern terminus of the S1 service of Vorarlberg S-Bahn.
