= Brand, Vorarlberg =

Brand
- Municipality
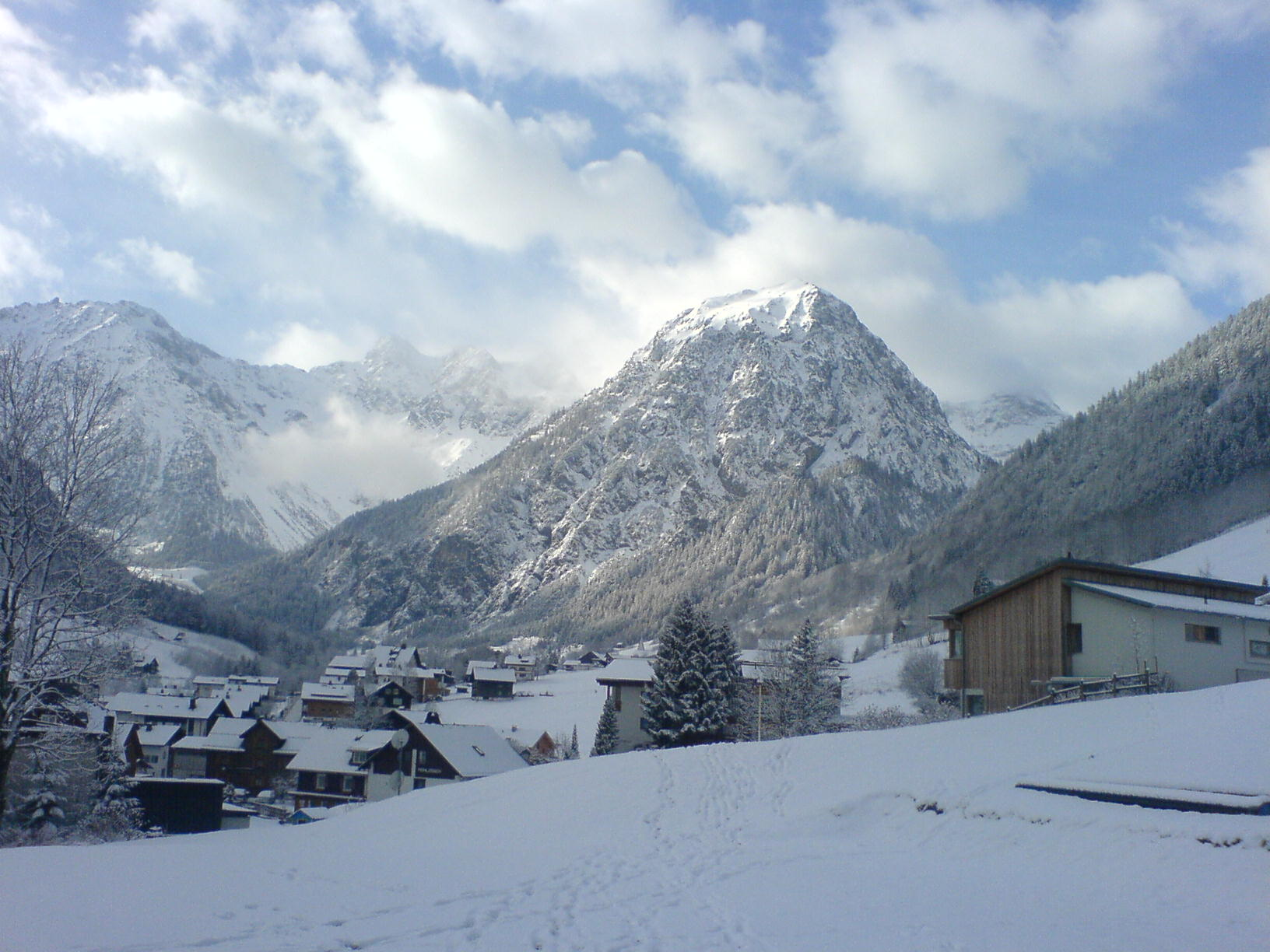

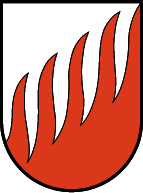
- Coat of arms

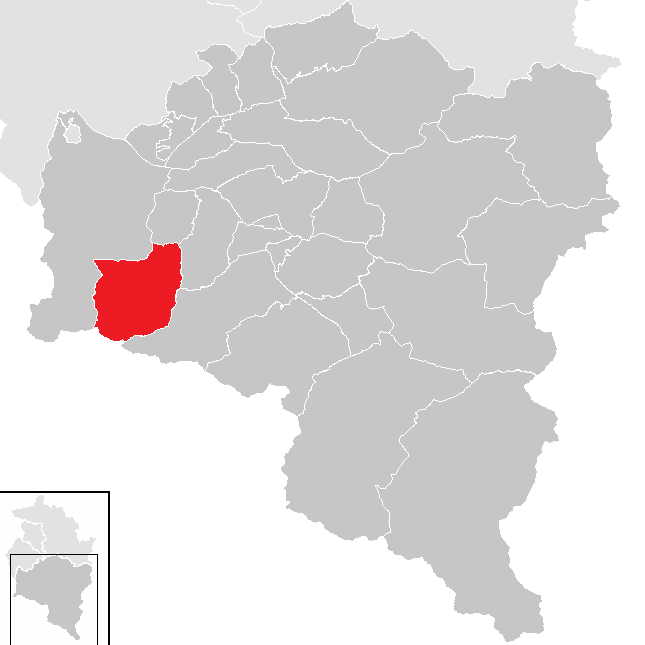
- Location in the district

- Location within Austria
- Coordinates: 47°06′00″N 09°44′00″E
- Country: Austria
- State: Vorarlberg
- District: Bludenz

Government
  - Mayor: Erich Schedler

Area
  - Total: 40.28 km^{2} (15.55 sq mi)
- Elevation: 1,010 m (3,310 ft)

Population (2018-01-01)
  - Total: 719
  - Density: 17.9/km^{2} (46.2/sq mi)
- Time zone: UTC+1 (CET)
  - Summer (DST): UTC+2 (CEST)
- Postal code: 6708
- Area code: 05559
- Vehicle registration: BZ
- Website: www.brand.at

Brand is a municipality in the district of Bludenz in the Austrian state of Vorarlberg.

== Geography ==
A tourist resort in western Austria, Brand is about five kilometres north of the Swiss border and eight kilometers east of the border with the Principality of Liechtenstein.

== Population ==
Historical population
| Year | Pop. | ±% |
|---|---|---|
| 1869 | 349 | — |
| 1880 | 327 | −6.3% |
| 1890 | 311 | −4.9% |
| 1900 | 296 | −4.8% |
| 1910 | 344 | +16.2% |
| 1923 | 337 | −2.0% |
| 1934 | 371 | +10.1% |
| 1939 | 376 | +1.3% |
| 1951 | 446 | +18.6% |
| 1961 | 530 | +18.8% |
| 1971 | 583 | +10.0% |
| 1981 | 644 | +10.5% |
| 1991 | 646 | +0.3% |
| 2001 | 709 | +9.8% |
| 2011 | 657 | −7.3% |

== Sports ==
Winter sports in Brand include both downhill and cross-country skiing, snowshoeing, sledding, winter hiking, skitouring, icefall climbing, skating, curling, horse riding, archery and indoor tennis. Summer activities include hiking, climbing, mountain biking, golf, tennis, horse riding, fly fishing, canyoning, archery, beach volleyball and soccer.
