= Bürs =

- Municipality
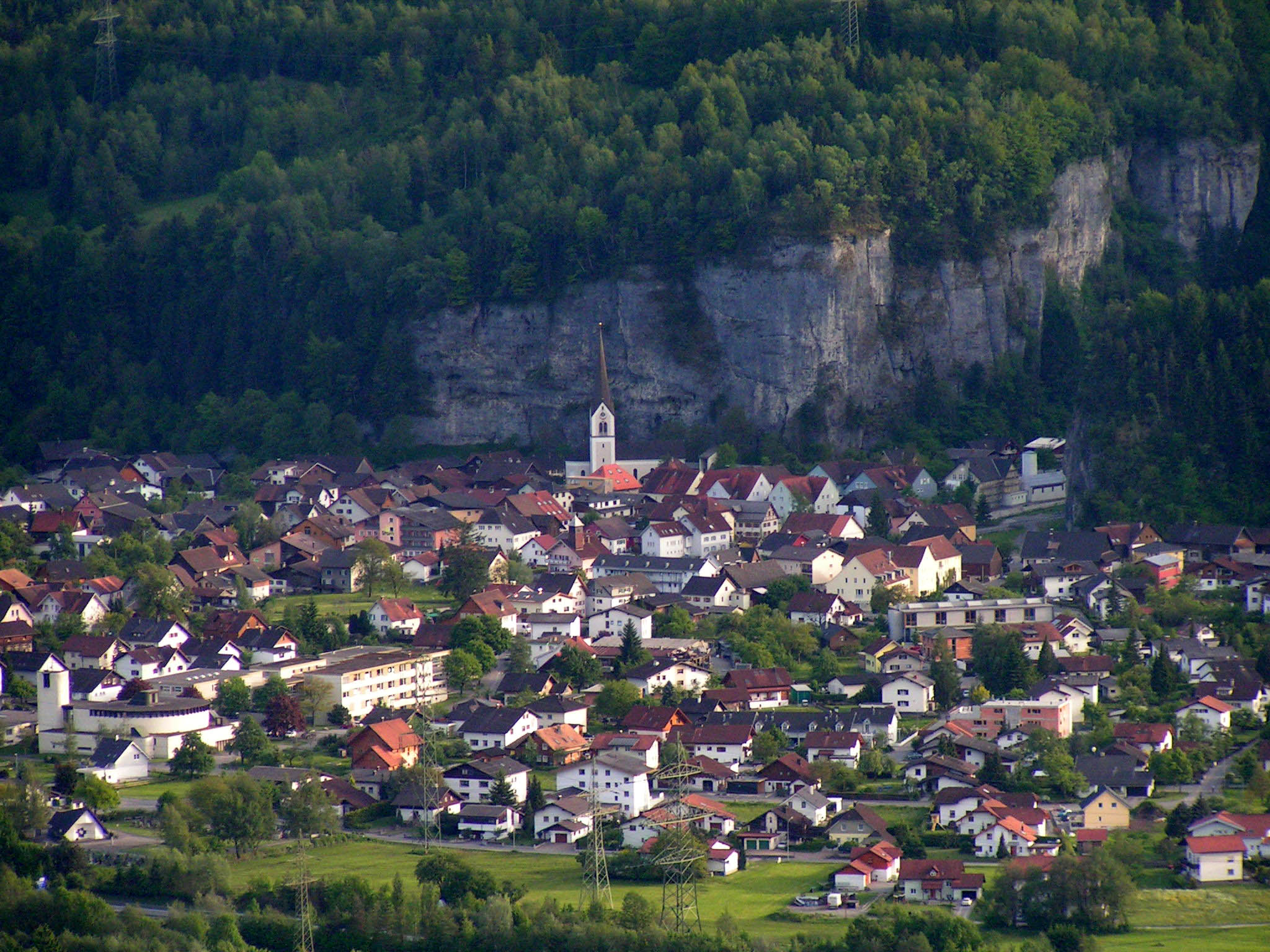

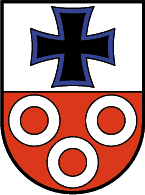
- Coat of arms

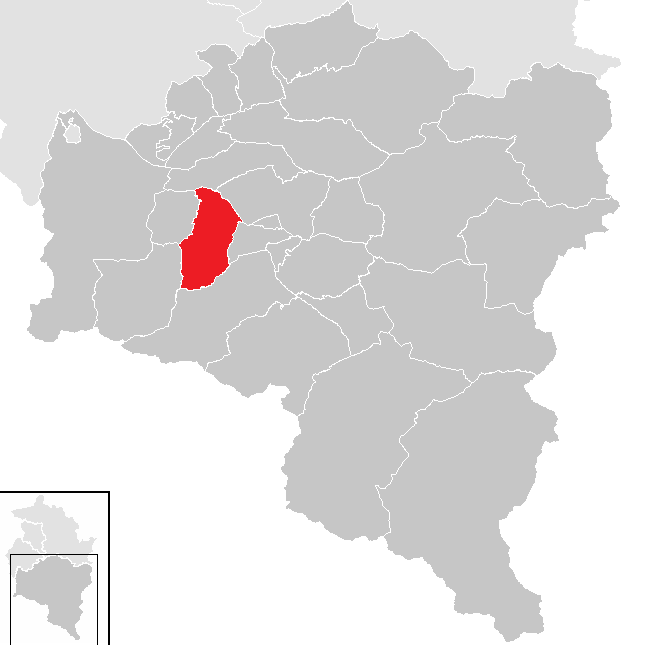
- Location in the district

- Location within Austria
- Coordinates: 47°08′00″N 09°48′00″E
- Country: Austria
- State: Vorarlberg
- District: Bludenz

Government
  - Mayor: Helmut Zimmermann (SPÖ)

Area
  - Total: 24.65 km^{2} (9.52 sq mi)
- Elevation: 570 m (1,870 ft)

Population (2018-01-01)
  - Total: 3,275
  - Density: 132.9/km^{2} (344.1/sq mi)
- Time zone: UTC+1 (CET)
  - Summer (DST): UTC+2 (CEST)
- Postal code: 6706
- Area code: 05552
- Vehicle registration: BZ
- Website: www.buers.at

Bürs is a municipality in the district of Bludenz in the Austrian state of Vorarlberg.

== Climate ==
Climate data for Bürs (1971–2000)
Month	Jan	Feb	Mar	Apr	May	Jun	Jul	Aug	Sep	Oct	Nov	Dec	Year
Record high °C (°F)	18.1 (64.6)	19.5 (67.1)	26.0 (78.8)	28.5 (83.3)	31.0 (87.8)	34.5 (94.1)	36.2 (97.2)	33.8 (92.8)	30.0 (86.0)	29.2 (84.6)	24.0 (75.2)	22.0 (71.6)	36.2 (97.2)
Mean daily maximum °C (°F)	1.6 (34.9)	4.5 (40.1)	10.1 (50.2)	14.0 (57.2)	19.3 (66.7)	21.7 (71.1)	24.0 (75.2)	23.5 (74.3)	19.6 (67.3)	14.2 (57.6)	6.2 (43.2)	2.5 (36.5)	13.4 (56.1)
Daily mean °C (°F)	−2.1 (28.2)	−0.5 (31.1)	3.9 (39.0)	7.7 (45.9)	12.8 (55.0)	15.5 (59.9)	17.7 (63.9)	17.1 (62.8)	13.2 (55.8)	8.3 (46.9)	2.2 (36.0)	−1.0 (30.2)	7.9 (46.2)
Mean daily minimum °C (°F)	−5.1 (22.8)	−3.9 (25.0)	−0.3 (31.5)	2.9 (37.2)	7.4 (45.3)	10.3 (50.5)	12.6 (54.7)	12.3 (54.1)	8.9 (48.0)	4.5 (40.1)	−0.9 (30.4)	−3.8 (25.2)	3.7 (38.7)
Record low °C (°F)	−24.5 (−12.1)	−18.5 (−1.3)	−19.5 (−3.1)	−6.0 (21.2)	−3.0 (26.6)	1.3 (34.3)	4.7 (40.5)	4.0 (39.2)	−1.2 (29.8)	−7.4 (18.7)	−18.0 (−0.4)	−21.8 (−7.2)	−24.5 (−12.1)
Average precipitation mm (inches)	83.1 (3.27)	70.2 (2.76)	87.5 (3.44)	96.7 (3.81)	115.9 (4.56)	162.4 (6.39)	168.2 (6.62)	157.8 (6.21)	123.9 (4.88)	85.3 (3.36)	96.7 (3.81)	93.5 (3.68)	1,341.2 (52.80)
Average snowfall cm (inches)	32.2 (12.7)	33.4 (13.1)	19.3 (7.6)	3.6 (1.4)	0.6 (0.2)	0.0 (0.0)	0.0 (0.0)	0.0 (0.0)	0.0 (0.0)	0.1 (0.0)	12.5 (4.9)	26.4 (10.4)	128.1 (50.4)
Average precipitation days (≥ 1.0 mm)	10.4	9.1	12.0	12.1	13.5	15.6	15.2	13.6	11.3	9.7	11.3	11.3	145.1
Average relative humidity (%) (at 14:00)	81.2	69.0	55.9	52.8	52.8	55.4	55.5	56.2	61.9	68.7	79.3	83.4	64.3
Source: Central Institute for Meteorology and Geodynamics

== Population ==
Historical population
Year	Pop.	±%
1869	753	—
1880	1,053	+39.8%
1890	1,327	+26.0%
1900	1,363	+2.7%
1910	1,303	−4.4%
1923	1,087	−16.6%
1934	1,476	+35.8%
1939	1,492	+1.1%
1951	1,816	+21.7%
1961	2,263	+24.6%
1971	2,775	+22.6%
1981	2,799	+0.9%
1991	2,954	+5.5%
2001	3,115	+5.5%
2011	3,110	−0.2%
