= Rankweil =

- Municipality
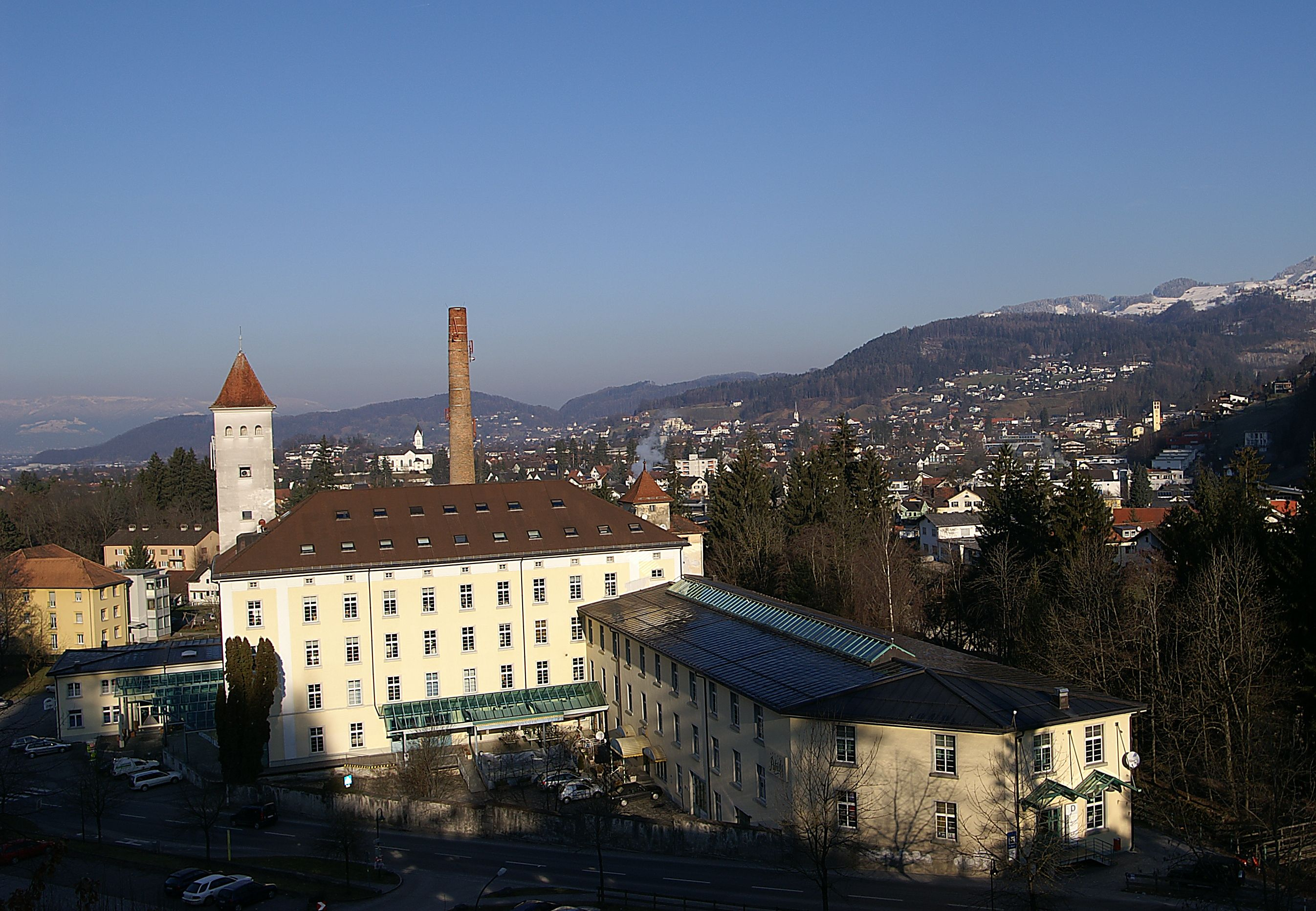

- Coat of arms

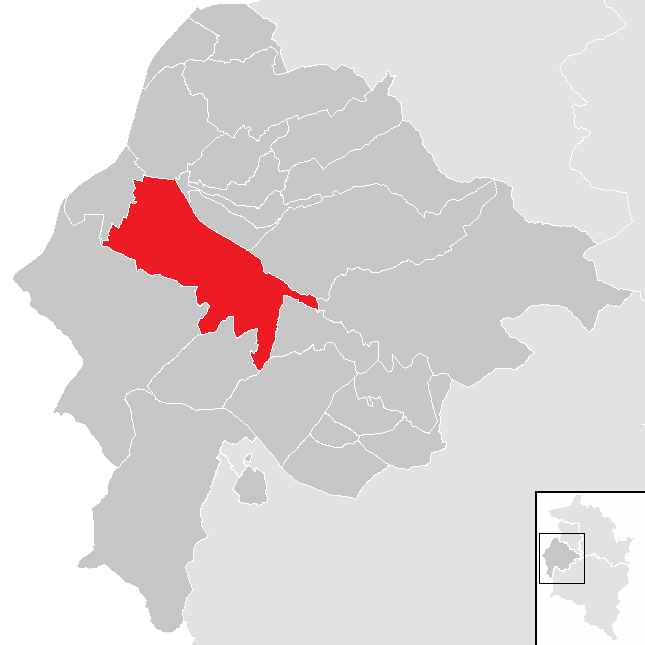
- Location in the district

- Location within Austria
- Coordinates: 47°16′00″N 09°39′00″E
- Country: Austria
- State: Vorarlberg
- District: Feldkirch

Government
  - Mayor: Katharina Wöß-Krall (ÖVP)

Area
  - Total: 21.87 km^{2} (8.44 sq mi)
- Elevation: 468 m (1,535 ft)

Population (2018-01-01)
  - Total: 11,855
  - Density: 542.1/km^{2} (1,404/sq mi)
- Time zone: UTC+1 (CET)
  - Summer (DST): UTC+2 (CEST)
- Postal code: 6830
- Area code: 05522
- Vehicle registration: FK
- Website: www.rankweil.at

Rankweil is a town in the westernmost Austrian state of Vorarlberg, in the district Feldkirch. It is the second largest town in the district Feldkirch and the eighth largest town in Vorarlberg.

== Geography ==
Rankweil is located in the southern Rhine Valley. Its largest river is the Frutz, from which the Mühlbach was channeled off through the town for utilization by ten hydroelectric plants.

The two precincts of Rankweil are Brederis and Rankweil. The town adjoins Koblach, Röthis, Sulz, Zwischenwasser, Laterns, Übersaxen, Satteins, Göfis, Feldkirch and Meiningen.

== History ==
At the time of the Roman Empire, today's Rankweil was known as "Vinomna". Vinomna was a transport hub where stone-paved Roman roads converged, including the main road from Chur to Augsburg. Rankweil itself was first mentioned in 842.

In 1375 the Counts of Montfort sold the dominion of Feldkirch, including Rankweil, to the Habsburgs. In 1618 Rankweil was granted market rights. Since its founding in 1918, Rankweil has belonged to the Austrian state of Vorarlberg.

== Politics ==
Rankweil's current mayor is Katharina Wöß-Krall, of the People's Party Rankweil. She has been in office since 2019. The local council of Rankweil consists of 33 members.

== Demographics ==
Historical population
Year	Pop.	±%
1869	2,410	—
1880	2,686	+11.5%
1890	2,976	+10.8%
1900	3,304	+11.0%
1910	3,923	+18.7%
1923	3,724	−5.1%
1934	4,229	+13.6%
1939	4,447	+5.2%
1951	5,244	+17.9%
1961	6,451	+23.0%
1971	8,654	+34.1%
1981	9,926	+14.7%
1991	10,509	+5.9%
2001	11,171	+6.3%
2011	11,567	+3.5%

Rankweil has been awarded a “family plus”-community – an award from the state of Vorarlberg for family-friendly communities.

== Notability and landmarks ==
Rankweil is a place of pilgrimage, known for its Basilica. Other sites include:

Pilgrimage church Unsere Liebe Frau Mariä Heimsuchung (Our Dear Lady Mary Visitation): The pilgrimage church, also called the Basilica Rankweil, had its beginnings around 700 as a fortress church. It has been at the center of a large parish since the 9th century. The church was badly damaged by a fire in the Old Zürich War in 1445. From 1470 onwards, the church was renovated and expanded. The central image of pilgrimage, a linden wood sculpture of Mary with her child, was created by the sculptor Johannes Rueland in 1470. Since 1757, the sculpture has been embedded in a gold-plated, Rococo-style altar. The church received the title of a Minor Basilica in 1985 and is located on an Austrian stretch of the Camino de Santiago. The church is also depicted on Rankweil's coat of arms.

St. Peter's Church: St. Peter's Church, first mentioned in 817, is located in the old center of Rankweil. It was converted to Baroque-style in 1627.

Open-Air Museum “Villa Rustica”: The Villa Rustica is an agricultural estate, consisting of several buildings; it was built by Roman settlers in the first century AD. In 1954, the remains of a building with an apse and a floor heating were discovered. Between 2002 and 2007, the former main building of the complex and a Roman bathhouse were excavated.

Sigmund Nachbauer Memorial: This monument was inaugurated in 1910. It commemorates Josef Sigmund Nachbauer, who commanded the Rankweiler Schützen at the time of the Napoleonic Wars; he was their leader in the uprising against Bavaria in 1809, was imprisoned in 1813, and died at Fortress Ingolstadt in the same year.

Town Hall: Today's town hall still features the preserved cellar vaults of the original building from before 1500. It has been in the possession of the community of Rankweil since 1822. It has been used as a court house, a town hall, an archive, a school, a poorhouse, a bank, teachers' quarters, community physicians housing, and gendarmerie officers quarters. Since its renovation in 1998, the building has served as the town hall again.

Wine production at the Liebfrauenberg: The first mention of wine production at the Liebfrauenberg was made in the Raetian Reichsurbar, in the year 842. There was an especially prosperous period of wine production in the 14th and 15th centuries. Decades of failed crops, vine diseases, and the construction of the Arlberg railway, which allowed for a cheap supply of wines from Italy, stopped the wine production. The production started again in 1983.

Museum of Printmaking: The Museum of Printmaking opened in 2004. It features a fully functional print shop. The main task of the museum is to document and preserve techniques of printmaking.

Natalie Beer Museum: The museum is dedicated to the poet and writer Natalie Beer, who lived in Rankweil for several decades until her death in 1987. It features personal belongings and most of the publications from the estate of Natalie Beer.

== Culture ==
There are 125 clubs in Rankweil. They are active in the fields of sports, culture, music, religion and family life. In the field of music, the club Altes Kino has organized concerts with national and international musicians like Zucchero, Bryan Adams, Gianna Nannini, Amy Macdonald, Dave Brubeck and Hubert von Goisern.

Events in Rankweil include the autumn market, the annual fair, and the Rankweil Sommer, a holiday program during the summer months, with more than 40 different events. In addition, every other year a carnival parade takes place in Rankweil.

== Sports ==
The sports infrastructure in Rankweil consists of soccer pitches, tennis and golf courts, a skate park, a sports shooters court, an ice rink and a fitness trail.

Sports clubs in Rankweil:

- FC Rot-Weiß Rankweil (soccer)
- HC Rankweil (ice hockey)
- Team Vorarlberg (cycling)

== Economy ==
Rankweil has a high density of taverns, stemming in large part from its long history as a place of pilgrimage. The share of agricultural land is about 47 percent of the total area.

Companies from Rankweil:

- Rauch
- Hirschmann Automotive
- Kunert Textile Technology
- Mahle König

== Transport ==
Rankweil railway station is an intermediate railway station of the Vorarlberg railway line between. It is served by the S1 and R5 regional train services of Vorarlberg S-Bahn and a Regional-Express train (REX 1). The nearest airports are St. Gallen–Altenrhein Airport, located 27 km (17 mi) north west and Zurich Airport, located 135 km (84 mi) west of Rankweil.

== Personalities ==
- Mario Reiter (*1970), alpine skier and Olympic champion
- Klaus Bodenmüller (*1962), athlete and European champion
- Wolfgang Linder (*1961), writer and cabaret artist
- Günter Dietrich (*1941), member of the Vorarlberg State Parliament and of the National Council of Austria
- Mario He (*1993), billiards player
- Herbert Keßler (*1925), governor of Vorarlberg
- Egmont Jenny (1924-2010), physician, politician and publicist
- Mathias Jenny (1865-1939), member of the local council and member of the National Council of Austria
