= Viktorsberg =

- Municipality
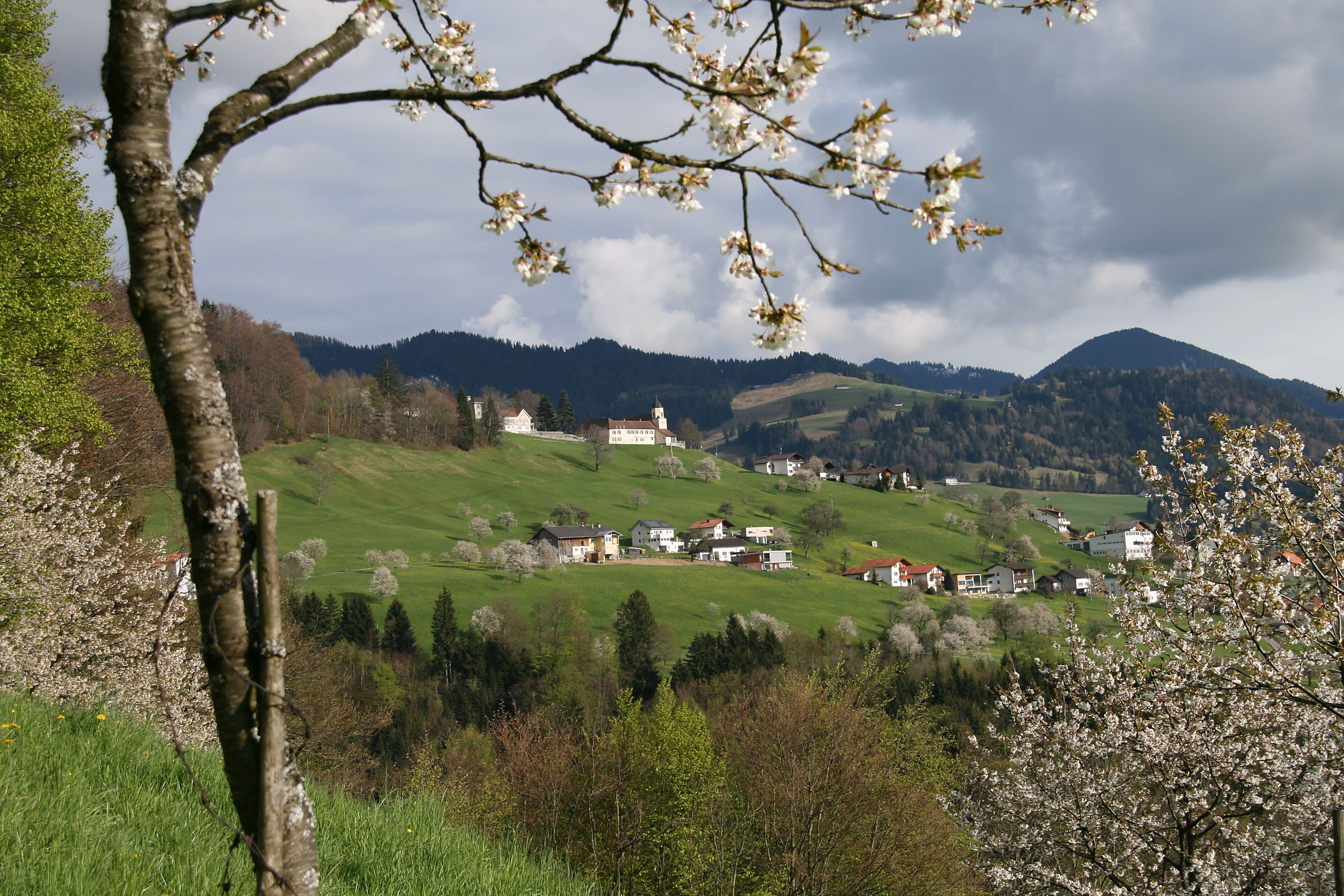

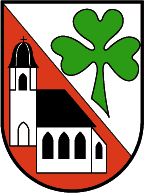
- Coat of arms

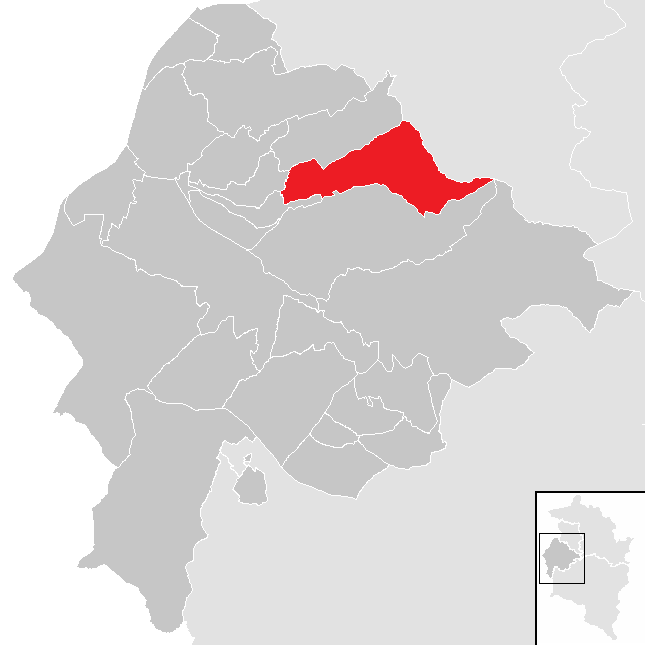
- Location in the district

- Location within Austria
- Coordinates: 47°17′N 09°40′E
- Country: Austria
- State: Vorarlberg
- District: Feldkirch

Government
  - Mayor: Philibert Ellensohn

Area
  - Total: 12.51 km^{2} (4.83 sq mi)
- Elevation: 879 m (2,884 ft)

Population (2018-01-01)
  - Total: 411
  - Density: 32.9/km^{2} (85.1/sq mi)
- Time zone: UTC+1 (CET)
  - Summer (DST): UTC+2 (CEST)
- Postal code: 6832
- Website: http://www.viktorsberg.at

Viktorsberg is a municipality in the district of Feldkirch in the Austrian state of Vorarlberg with 438 inhabitants (as of January 1, 2025).

== Geography ==
Viktorsberg lies in the Vorarlberg-Vorderland region, in the Feldkirch district, at an altitude of 879 meters. 73% of its area is forested, and 15.2% is alpine pasture. there are no other Cadastral communities within Viktorsberg. The municipality belongs to the Vorarlberg Rhine Valley region and is situated on the situated on the slope of a spur on the Kugelgruppe mountain range of the Bregenz Forest Mountains.

=== Neighbouring municipalities ===
The municipality of Viktorsberg shares a border with five other municipalities in Vorarlberg. These are, clockwise from the north, the city of Dornbirn in the district of the same name, and the municipalities of Zwischenwasser, Röthis, Weiler, and Fraxern in the district of Feldkirch, Vorarlberg

== Population ==
Historical population
Year	Pop.	±%
1869	196	—
1880	209	+6.6%
1890	203	−2.9%
1900	251	+23.6%
1910	234	−6.8%
1923	232	−0.9%
1934	232	+0.0%
1939	257	+10.8%
1951	271	+5.4%
1961	313	+15.5%
1971	352	+12.5%
1981	363	+3.1%
1991	378	+4.1%
2001	378	+0.0%
2011	377	−0.3%

== History ==
Viktorsberg was named after the Pope and Martyr St Victor (died c. 202), whose skull has likely been kept in the Viktorsberg church since the 8th century, the first documented mention of the town is found in the Rhaetian property register of 842. Among the most curious and interesting figures associated with the saints of Vorarlberg is undoubtedly the Irish hermit Eusebius. Driven from his native island in the mid 9th century by Danish and Norwegian raids, Eusebius found refuge in Viktorsberg. He maintained close ties with the Abbey of Saint Gall and is even said to have advised the Carolingian Emperor Charles III (d. 888). In gratitude, the emperor made a donation to support the small community and placed Viktorsberg under the protection and ownership of the Abbey of St. Gall. A St. Gall nectrology records Eusebius' death on January 31, 884.

The centuries following his death seemed to have forgotten Eusebius. Not a single historian mentions the strange Irish recluse . However, at the beginning of the 17th century, the Überlingen popular and devotional writer Johann Georg Tibianus recounts that Eusebius had rebuked farmers for blaspheming Sunday in the fields of Brederis and was therefore supposedly beheaded by them with a scythe. To the astonishment of his murderers, Eusebius, immediately after his execution, picked up his severed head and left the scene. He is said to have eventually laid his head to rest on the altar of the Viktorsberg church. In 1730, Eusebius was even beatified by the Roman Congregation of Rites. The trefoil in the coat of arms indicates the Irish (formerly Scottish) connection.

Little is known about the development and history of the monastery, as it burned down twice, destroying many old documents in the process. It is only known that the Counts of Montfort later owned Viktorsberg. In 1370, Count Rudolf III of Montfort began to improve the church and monastery buildings. On September 13, 1383, he granted the newly constructed monastery to the Franciscans . In 1398, the House of Austria acquired the patronage of the monastery. It belonged to the Upper German (Strasbourg) Franciscan Province of Argentina and, after the division of the order in 1517, became a convent of Franciscan Conventual (Minorites).

In 1642, the monastery burned down completely after being struck by lightning. In January 1785, the Franciscan monastery was dissolved by Joseph II.

The Habsburgs ruled the towns in Vorarlberg alternately from Tyrol and Further Austria (Freiburg im Breisgau). From 1805 to 1814, the town belonged to Bavaria, then again to Austria. Viktorsberg has been part of the Austrian state of Vorarlberg since its founding in 1861. From 1945 to 1955, the town was part of the French occupation zone in Austria.

On April 18, 2020, two brothers explored a narrow, 10-meter-deep cave using rope climbing techniques and recovered a rusty object which a bomb disposal expert identified as a German Egg Hand Grenade 39, a relic from the Second World War . The cave was searched and sealed with iron rails and stones due to the risk of falls for hikers.

== Culture ==
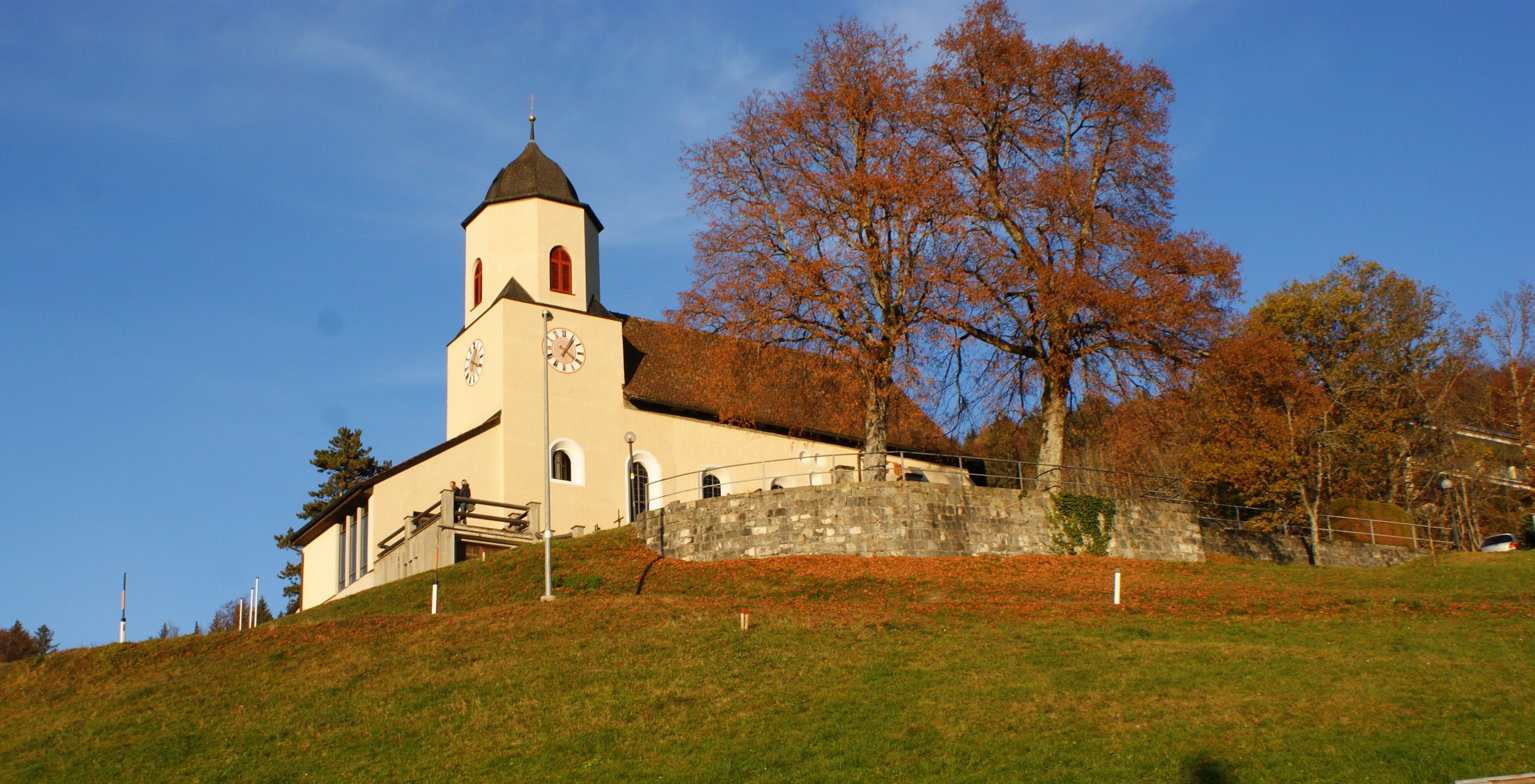
Parish church and monastery

List of listed buildings in Viktorsberg

Catholic Parish Church of St. Victor, Viktorsberg

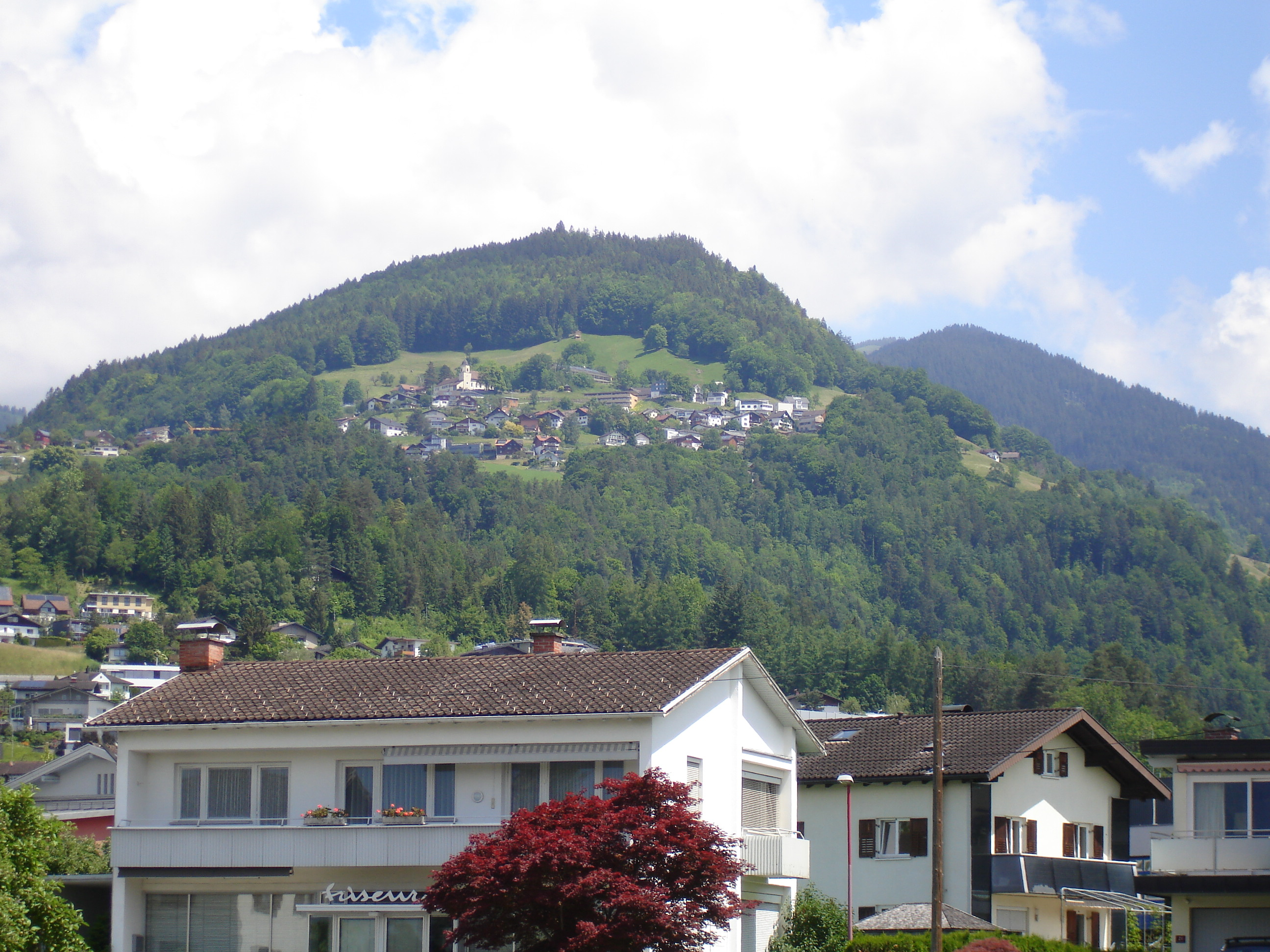
Viktorsberg stands 300-400 meters above the Alpine Rhine valley, and view from Sulz of the village.

== Economy and infrastructure ==
By 1999, the former lung sanatorium, located at an altitude of almost 900 m, had been converted into a hotel. Since then, young people with disabilities have been trained there in hospitality professions.

In 2010, there were eighteen agricultural and forestry businesses in the municipality, two of which were full-time operations. According to a survey by the Austrian Federal Economic Chamber, in 2022, an average of 104 people were employed in five private-sector businesses in Viktorsberg.

In Viktorsberg there is (as of 2024) a kindergarten, a primary school and a village shop

Viktorsberg has been debt-free since 2021 and is expected to remain so in 2024. In 2021 and 2022, it was the only debt-free municipality in Vorarlberg.

== Traffic ==
Viktorsberg can be reached via state road 70. This road ends above the church, so the village is free of through traffic. Bus route 493 of the Vorarlberg Transport Association runs approximately hourly from the Sulz-Röthis stop on the Lindau–Bludenz railway line to Viktorsberg on weekdays during the day . A call-a-bus service operates at night, on weekends and public holidays.

== Policy ==
In Vorarlberg, citizens elect the members of the municipal council every five years by marking a list of candidates or by majority vote if no list of candidates is presented. They also elect the mayor by marking a list of candidates.

In its inaugural meeting, the municipal council elects from among its members – unless a public election has taken place – a mayor, in accordance with Section 61 of the Municipal Code , and then a municipal executive board of at least three members . However, according to Section 55, the number of these "municipal councilors" may not exceed one-fourth of the number of municipal representatives.

The mayor chairs the generally public meetings of the municipal council, where municipal matters are discussed and decisions are made. Observers have no right to speak or vote. The municipal council can appoint committees as needed. Meetings of the municipal executive board and its committees are not open to the public.

=== Seat allocation after the elections ===
- Municipal elections 1985: Municipal list 9.
- Municipal elections 1990: Municipal list 9.
- Municipal elections 1995: Municipal list 9.
- Due to a lack of electable lists, the municipal council elections in 2000, 2005, 2010, 2015, 2020 and 2025 were conducted by majority vote.

=== Mayors ===
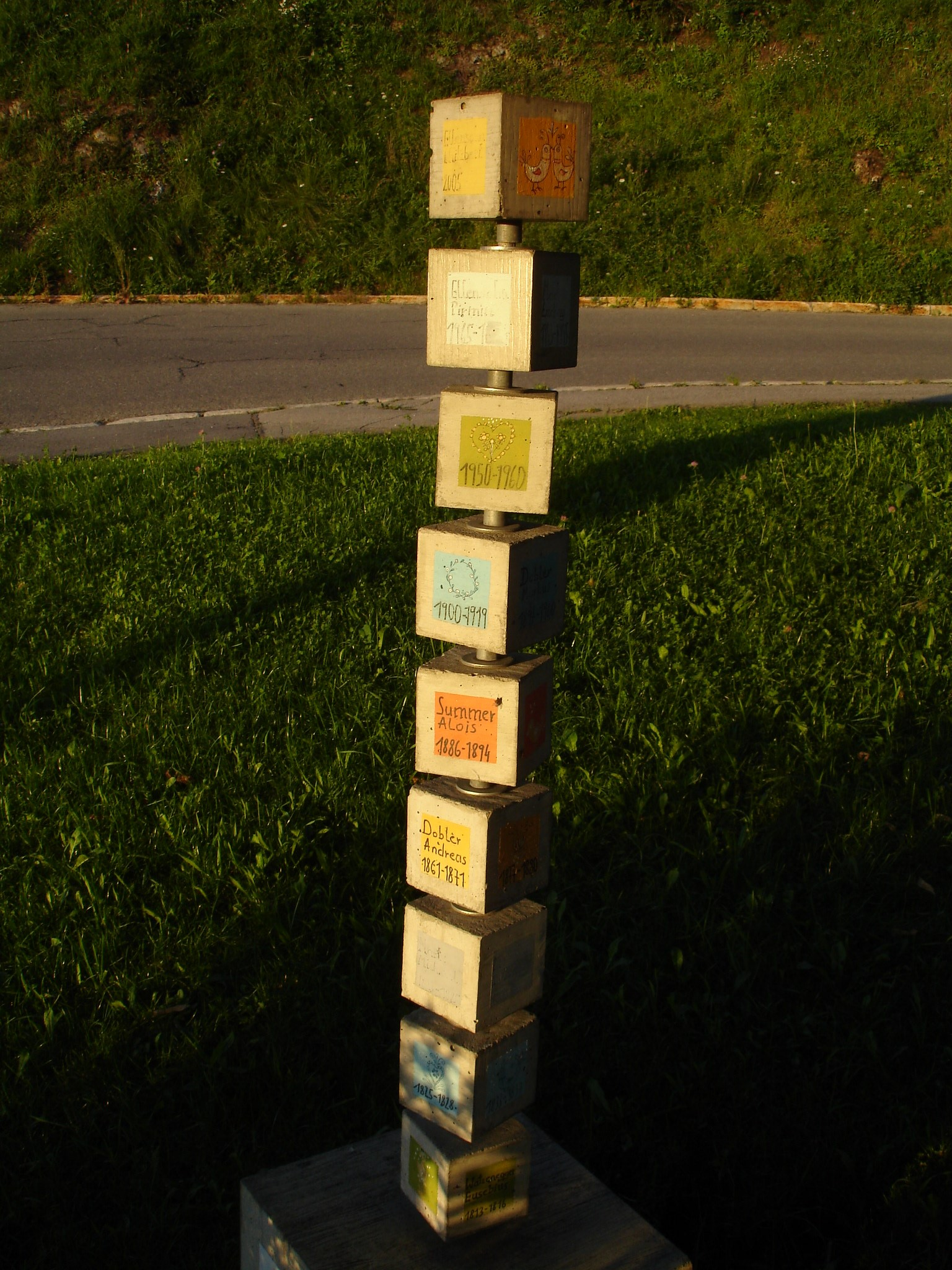
Column at the Viktorsberg municipal office bearing the names of former mayors

- List of Mayors
  - 1945–1950 Benedikt Marte
  - 1950–1960 Adolf Blum
  - 1960–1965 Ernst Ritter
  - 1965–1984 Pirmin Ellensohn
  - 1984–1998 Arthur Marte
  - 1998–2005 Jakob Ammann
  - 2005–2024 Philibert Ellensohn
  - since 20 September 2024 Manuela Marte

== Notable Individuals ==
- Eusebius of Rankweil († 884), monk and hermit
- Mario Dancsó (* 1978), musician and composer
