= Meiningen (disambiguation) =

Meiningen is a town in the southern part of the state of Thuringia, Germany.

Meiningen may also refer to:

- Meiningen, Austria, a municipality in the district of Feldkirch in the Austrian state of Vorarlberg
- Meiningen Court Orchestra, one of the oldest and most traditional orchestras in Europe, associated with the Meiningen Court Theatre
- Meiningen Court Theatre, Thuringia, a building
- Meiningen Ensemble or Company, the court theatre of the former German duchy of Saxe-Meiningen
- Meiningen station, a railway station in Thuringia
- Meiningen Steam Locomotive Works, Thuringia

== See also ==
- Amtsgericht Meiningen, a district court in Thuringia
- Saxe-Meiningen, a former duchy in Thuringia
- Schmalkalden-Meiningen, a Landkreis in the southwest of Thuringia
- Schweinfurt–Meiningen railway, a single-tracked line in the German states of Bavaria and Saxony
