= Carl Lampert =

Austrian priest (1894–1944)

Blessed Carl Lampert
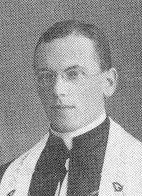
- c. 1918.

Priest
- Born: 9 January 1894; Göfis, Feldkirch, Austria-Hungary
- Died: 13 November 1944 (aged 50); Halle an der Saale, Nazi Germany
- Venerated in: Roman Catholic Church
- Beatified: 13 November 2011, Dornbirn, Vorarlberg, Austria by Cardinal Angelo Amato
- Feast: 13 November
- Attributes: Cassock
- Patronage: Prisoners; Persecuted Christians

Carl Lampert (9 January 1894 – 13 November 1944) was an Austrian Catholic priest who served as the pro-vicar for the Diocese of Feldkirch and was an outspoken critic of Nazism during World War II. This led to constant surveillance against him and his eventual arrests on several occasions. This culminated with his final arrest in 1943 and eventual execution by guillotine in 1944 alongside another Christian prisoner.

He was declared to have been killed "in odium fidei" (in hatred of the faith) and was beatified on 13 November 2011 in Austria; Cardinal Angelo Amato presided over it on the behalf of Pope Benedict XVI, who had approved the cause.

== Life ==
Lampert was born as the last of seven children of Franz Xaver Lampert and Maria Rosina Lampert in Feldkirch in 1894. He attended school in his hometown and would attend a state high school after the completion of his first studies; the death of his father seemed to jeopardize this but an uncle of his provided financial aid to him in an effort to see Lampert through his education.

Lampert commenced his studies for the priesthood in 1914 in Brixen and received his ordination from Bishop Franz Eggar on 12 May 1918 during World War I. He celebrated his first Mass on 26 May 1918. Following his ordination he worked as a chaplain in Dornbirn and was involved in pastoral work with adolescents. In 1930 he moved - with the financial support of Bishop Sigismund Waitz - to Rome for studies in canon law and moved to new quarters at the Collegio Teutonico di Santa Maria dell'Anima until 1935 as a secretary to the Roman Rota. Pope Pius XI later made him a monsignor in 1935.

On 1 October 1935, he was stationed in the Diocese of Innsbruck where Waitz wanted him to perform several administration duties. Around this time he was considered to be the diocese's new bishop but Pius XI did not choose him; instead he was made Pro-Vicar of that diocese on 15 January 1939. In 1940 he attempted in vain to secure the release of Fr Otto Neururer and, when he was, killed Lampert published an obituary in a church newsletter for him. However, he was arrested for this due to violating Nazi confidentiality laws and was deported to Dachau on 25 August 1940. He was then sent to Sachsenhausen in Berlin on 1 September 1940 where he was forced to do labor in a penal colony. A popular saying of his while he was imprisoned was "in the name of Christ for the Church". He was sent back to Dachau on 15 December 1940 and remained there for eight months before being released on 1 August 1941 and sent to Stettin. Despite being freed, he was put under intense surveillance and was regarded with much suspicion; his phone calls were tapped and all correspondence was read. He continued to work as a pastor and as a hospital chaplain.

Lampert was arrested for the last time on 4 February 1943 and endured intense interrogations and was also tortured. He was found to be guilty of treason and sedition on 30 December 1943 and was sent to Torgau on 14 January 1944, where he spent seven months in solitary confinement. A third trial gave him the death sentence on 8 September 1944. Lampert, alongside a fellow priest,- was executed by guillotine on 13 November 1944 at 4:00pm.

His remains were cremated and buried in Halle an der Saale and were returned to his hometown in 1948.

== Beatification ==
The beatification process commenced on 5 September 1997 under Pope John Paul II and granted Lampert the title Servant of God. The diocesan process spanned from 1 October 1998 to 18 November 2003 and had to ascertain the facts about whether or not Lampert died in hatred of his Christian faith. The process was validated on 14 March 2008 and allowed for the drafting of the Positio, documenting his life and reasons for how he died in hatred of the faith, which was submitted to the Congregation for the Causes of Saints in 2009.

On 27 June 2011, his beatification was approved as Pope Benedict XVI acknowledged the fact that Lampert had indeed been killed in the camps for his faith. Cardinal Angelo Amato presided over the beatification in Austria on the behalf of the Pope on 13 November 2011.

The current postulator assigned to the cause is Andrea Ambrosi.
