= Laterns-Gapfohl =

Ski resort Vorarlberg, Austria

Coordinates: 47.261°N 9.742°E

Skigebiet Laterns-Gapfohl (Laterns-Gapfohl ski area)
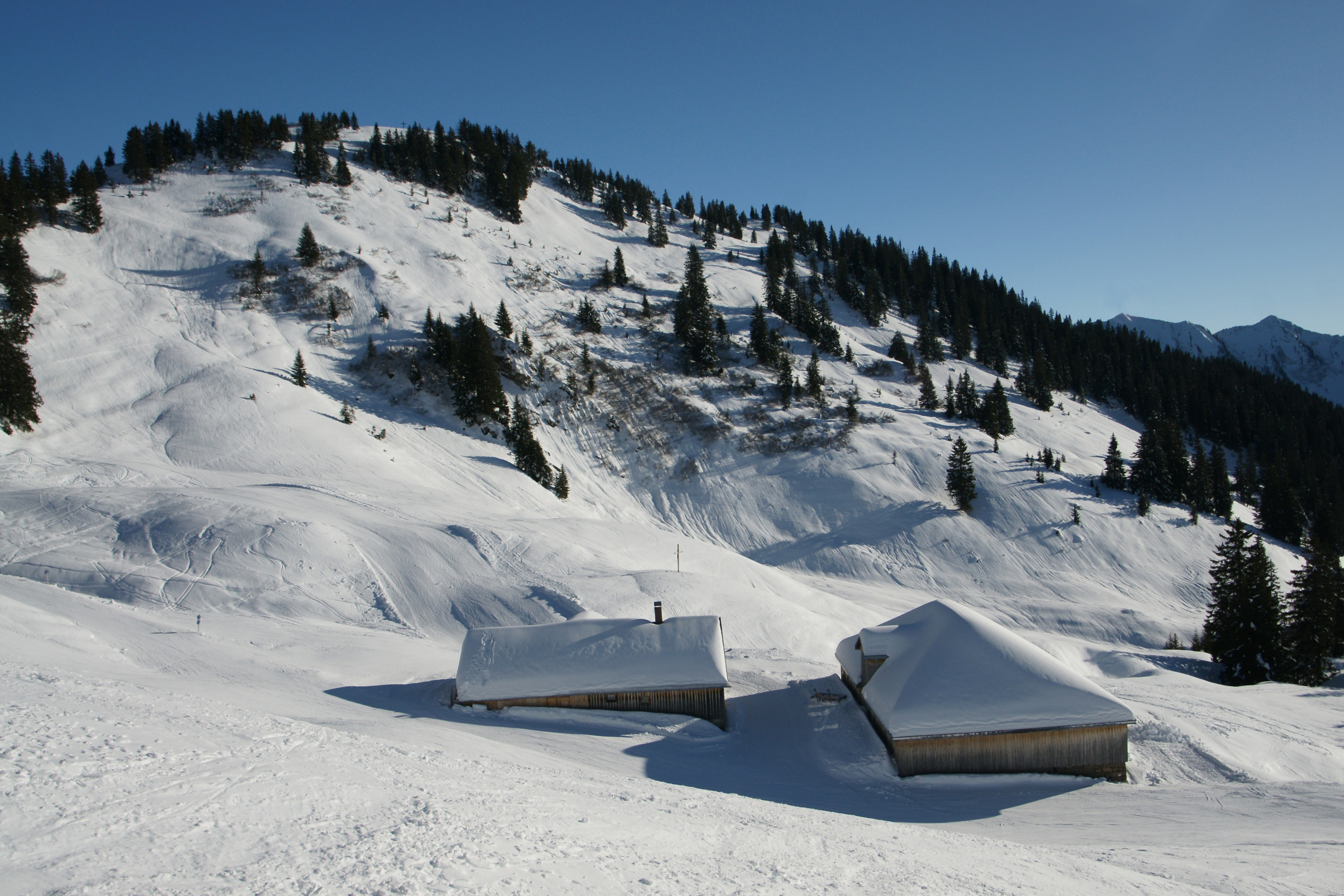
- Interactive map of Skigebiet Laterns-Gapfohl (Laterns-Gapfohl ski area)
- Location: Vorarlberg, Austria
- Nearest city: Feldkirch, Bludenz, Damüls
- Skiable area: 27 km
- Website: https://www.laterns.net/winter

The Laterns-Gapfohl ski area is a winter sports area in the Austrian municipality of Laterns in Vorarlberg. The ski area stretches across 27 km of slopes.

== Geography ==
The Laterns-Gapfohl ski area is located in the Laterns Valley in Vorarlberg, a side valley of the Alpine Rhine Valley. It stretches across the south-west and south-east slopes of the Nob, a mountain in the Freschengruppe of the Bregenz Forest Mountains, at an altitude from 1,035 m up to 1,771 m above sea level.

At the foot of the ski area lies the village of Innerlaterns, which belongs to the municipality of Laterns.

== Pistes ==
In addition to the seven slopes of different levels of difficulty (easy: 11 km, medium: 12 km, difficult: 4 km) with a total length of 27 km, three ski routes are marked.

There is also a 4 km long natural toboggan run. Furthermore, guided snowshoe hikes and numerous ski tours are offered.

== Lifts ==
A total of 5 lifts are operated in the Laterns-Gapfohl ski area: a 4-seated chairlift, a 6-seated chairlift, 3 drag lifts and a magic carpet.

== Photo gallery ==
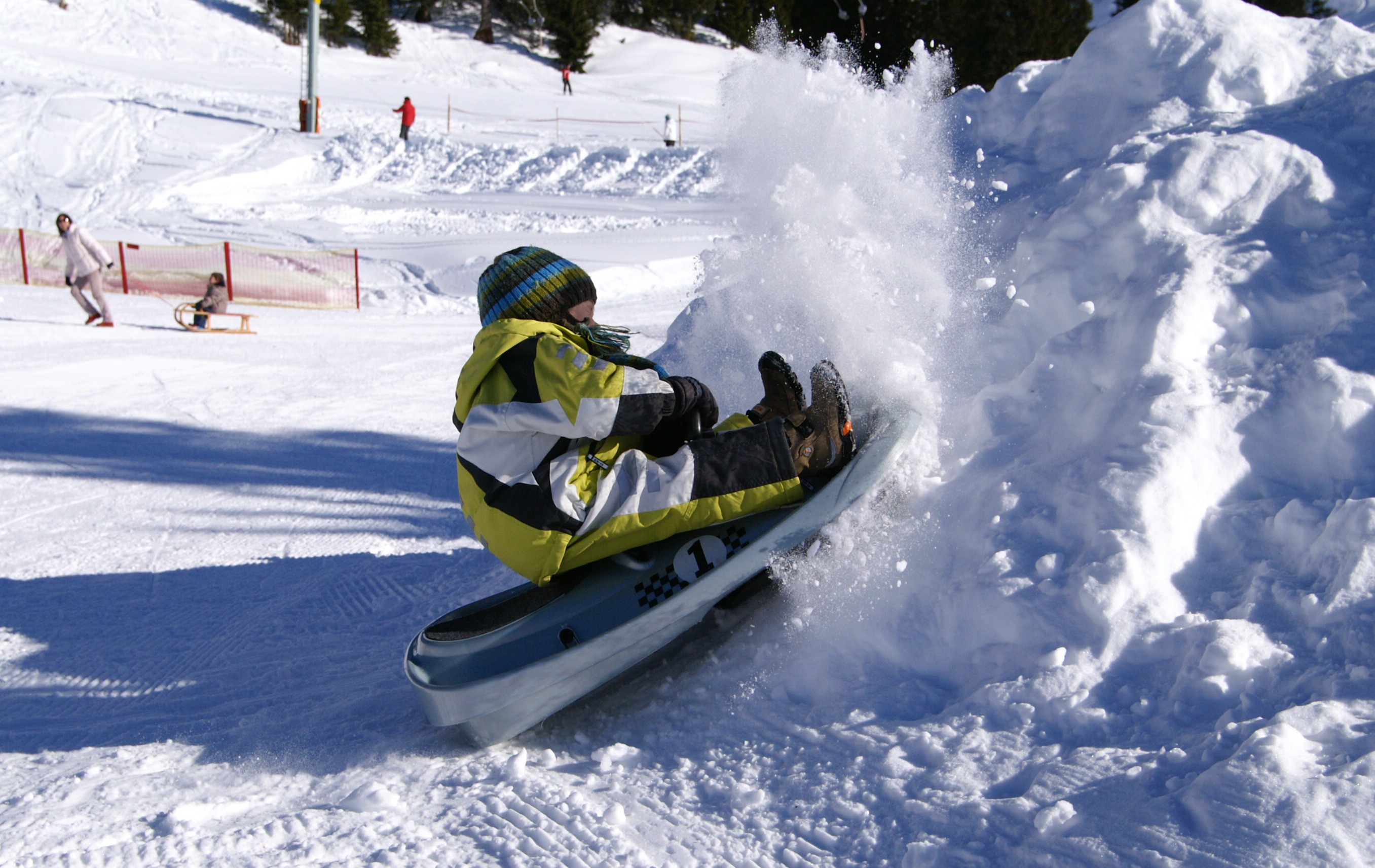
Tobogganing child in the Laterns-Gapfohl ski area

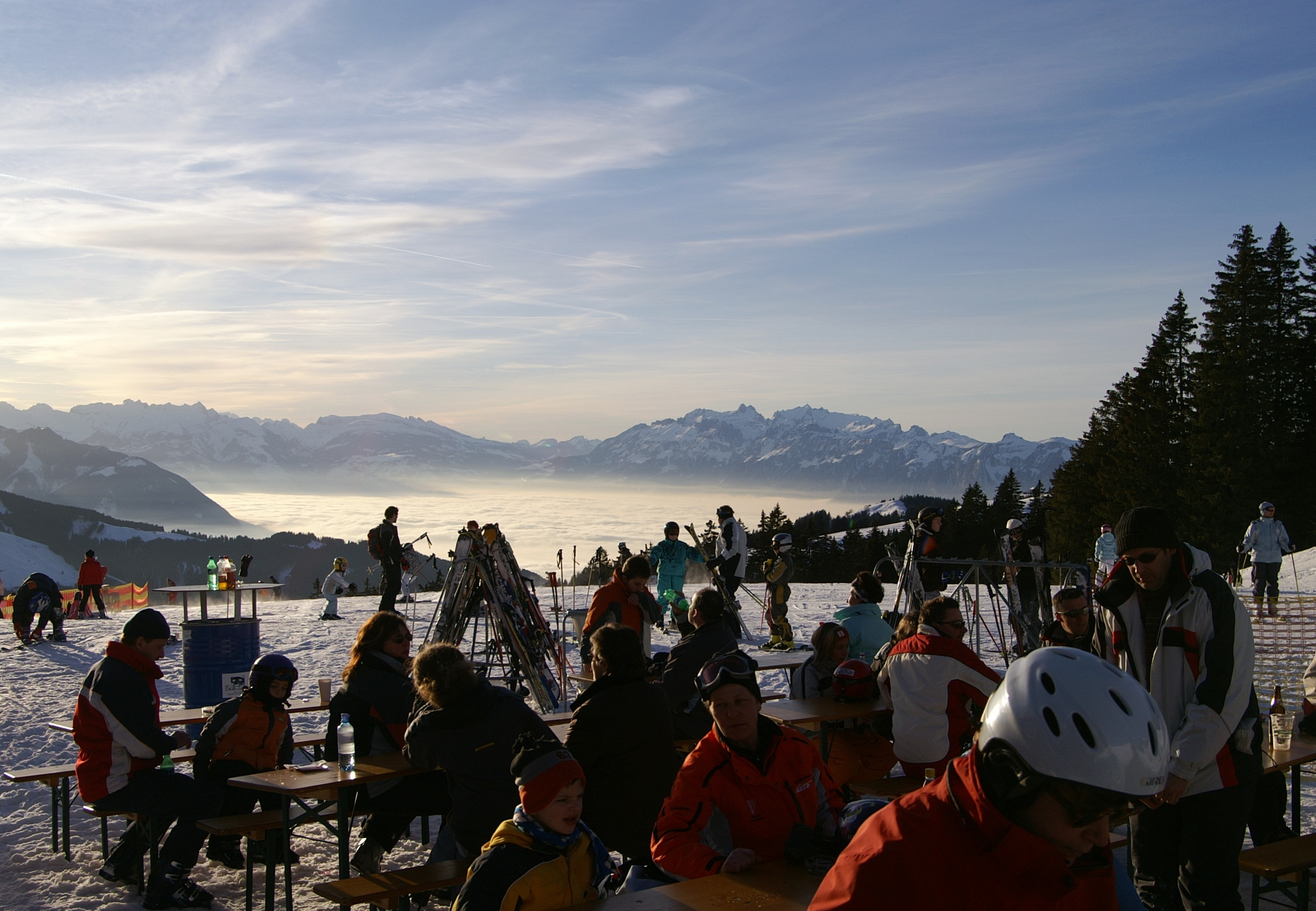
Ski area Laterns-Gapfohl: View from the Berghof over the Alpine Rhine Valley (the towns of Rankweil and Feldkirch shrouded in fog) in the background the Swiss mountains with the Alpstein mountains.

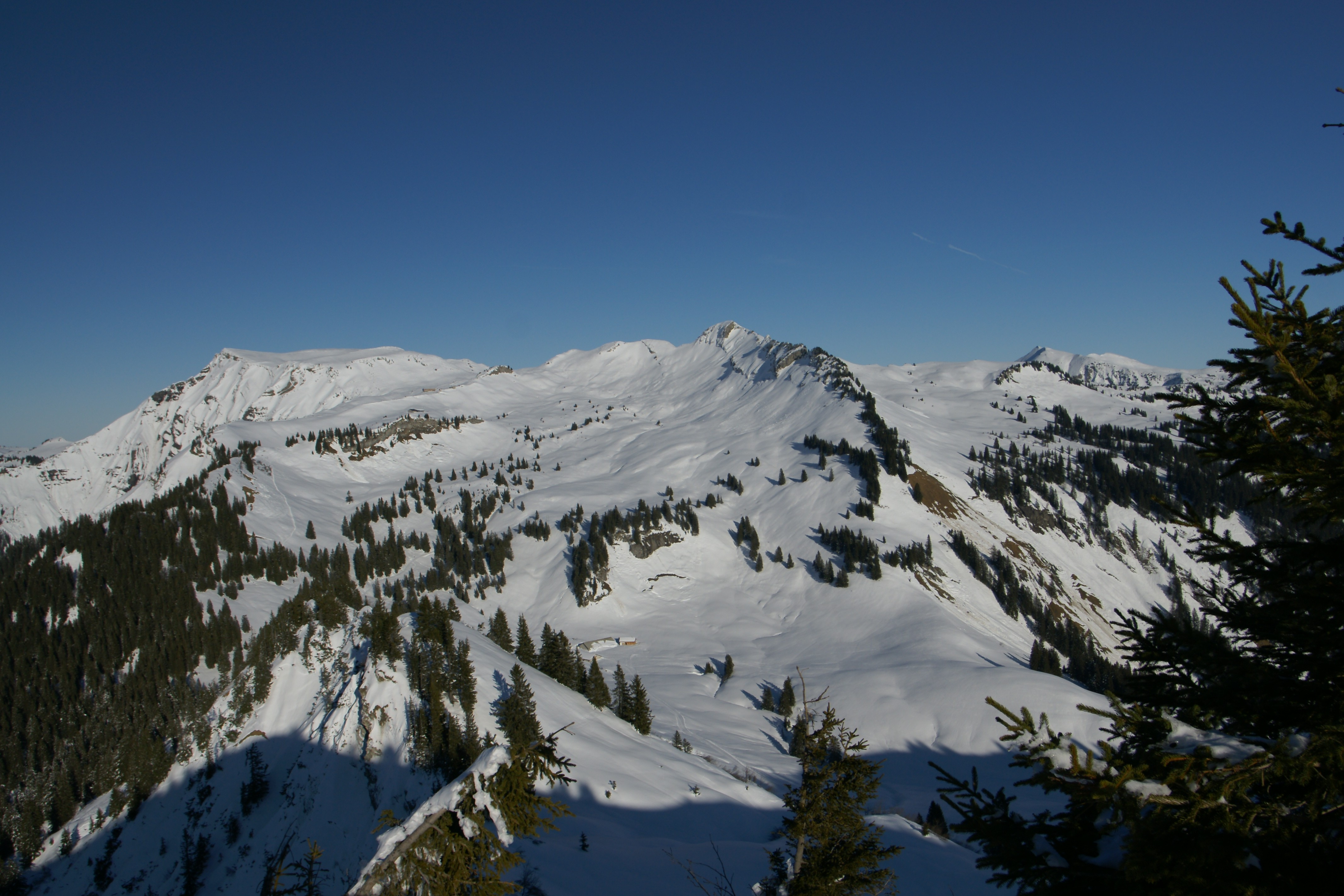
The Hoher Freschen in the Bregenz Forest Mountains seen from the Nob in Laterns-Gapfohl in Vorarlberg.
