= Vorarlberg Rhine Valley =

The Vorarlberg Rhine Valley (German: Vorarlberger Rheintal), also called the Vorarlberg Oberland and Unterland, is a section of the Alpine Rhine Valley and is divided into the Upper and Lower Rhine Valley (oberes and unteres Rheintal) based on the direction of flow of the river. The Unterland runs from the shore of Lake Constance to the Kummenberg, the Upper Rhine valley lies south of the Kummenberg. The Unterland covers the whole of the administrative district of Dornbirn and all the territories of the district of Bregenz that lie within the Rhine Valley. In this region, which includes the urban areas of Bregenz and Dornbirn, live about 180,000 people, around half the population of Vorarlberg. The "green lung" of this region is the Vorarlberg Ried, which is on the border with Switzerland and is surrounded by the settlements of Vorarlberg on three sides.

Geographically the Lower Rhine Valley also includes the municipality of Altach. Due to its historical links with the municipality of Götzis and membership of the district of Feldkirch, Altach is often considered part of the Oberland.
