= Altach =

- Municipality
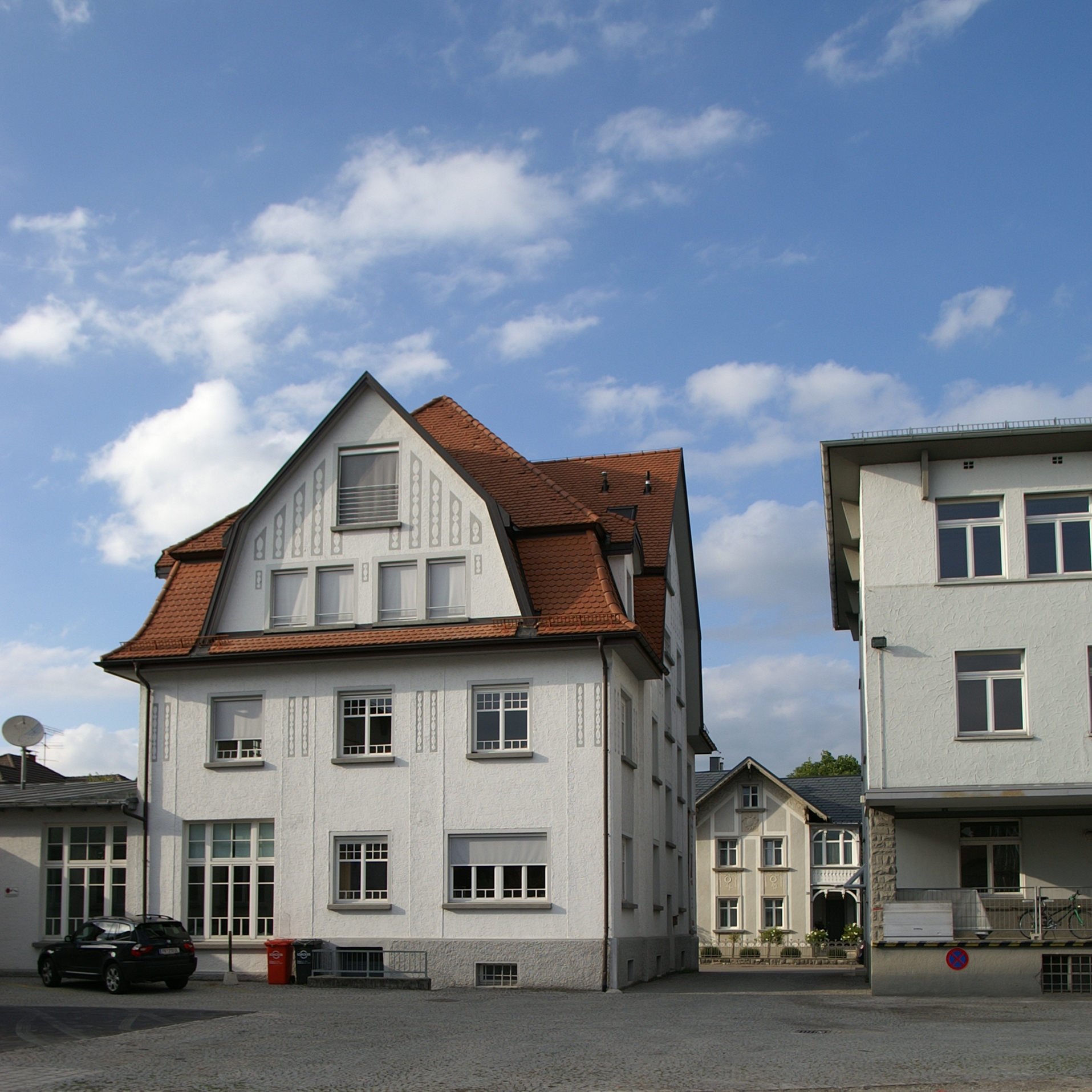

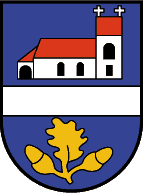
- Coat of arms

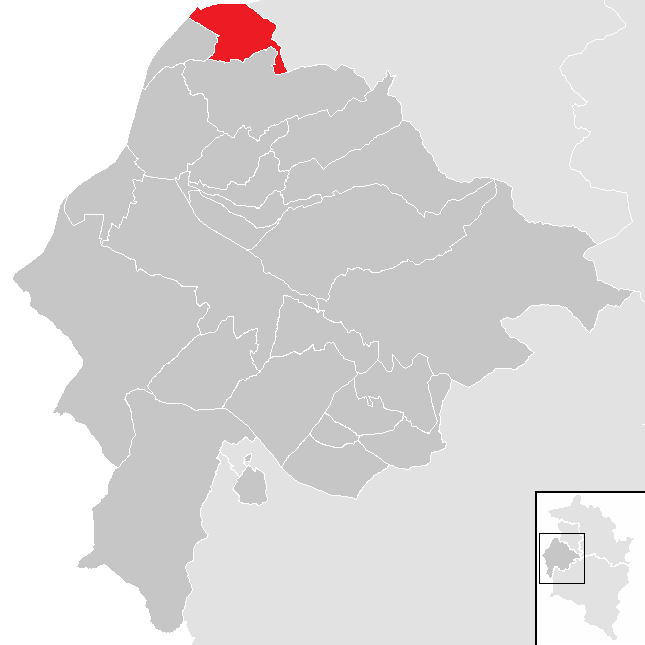
- Location in the district

- Location within Austria
- Coordinates: 47°21′00″N 09°39′00″E
- Country: Austria
- State: Vorarlberg
- District: Feldkirch

Government
  - Mayor: Markus Giesinger

Area
  - Total: 5.36 km^{2} (2.07 sq mi)
- Elevation: 412 m (1,352 ft)

Population (2018-01-01)
  - Total: 6,624
  - Density: 1,240/km^{2} (3,200/sq mi)
- Time zone: UTC+1 (CET)
  - Summer (DST): UTC+2 (CEST)
- Postal code: 6844
- Area code: 05576
- Vehicle registration: FK
- Website: www.altach.at

Altach is a municipality in the district of Feldkirch, in the westernmost Austrian state of Vorarlberg.

== Neighboring municipalities ==
Five other municipalities surround Altach: Hohenems in the district of Dornbirn, Götzis and Mäder in the district of Feldkirch, and Oberriet and Diepoldsau in the Swiss canton St. Gallen.

== History ==
The Habsburgs ruled over the villages in Vorarlberg alternately from Tyrol and Further Austria. In 1801, Altach was separated from neighboring Götzis; from 1805 to 1814 Altach belonged to Bavaria, then reverted to Austria. Altach has been part of the Austrian state of Vorarlberg since the latter's founding in 1861. From 1945 to 1955, the municipality was in the French occupation zone in Austria.

== Population ==
Historical population
Year	Pop.	±%
1869	935	—
1880	1,009	+7.9%
1890	1,130	+12.0%
1900	1,339	+18.5%
1910	1,608	+20.1%
1923	1,516	−5.7%
1934	1,700	+12.1%
1939	1,688	−0.7%
1951	1,930	+14.3%
1961	2,802	+45.2%
1971	3,977	+41.9%
1981	4,430	+11.4%
1991	4,911	+10.9%
2001	5,704	+16.1%
2011	6,394	+12.1%

== Sport ==
As of the season 2021-22, the football club SC Rheindorf Altach plays in Bundesliga, the highest division.

== Transport ==
Altach railway station is on the main west–east route connecting the Vorarlberg railway line (Vorarlbergbahn) in the directions of Bregenz and Feldkirch/Bludenz, continuing eastward over the Arlberg Railway line to Innsbruck and beyond. The railway station is served by the S1 service of Vorarlberg S-Bahn.
