= Röns =

- Municipality
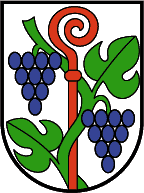
- Coat of arms

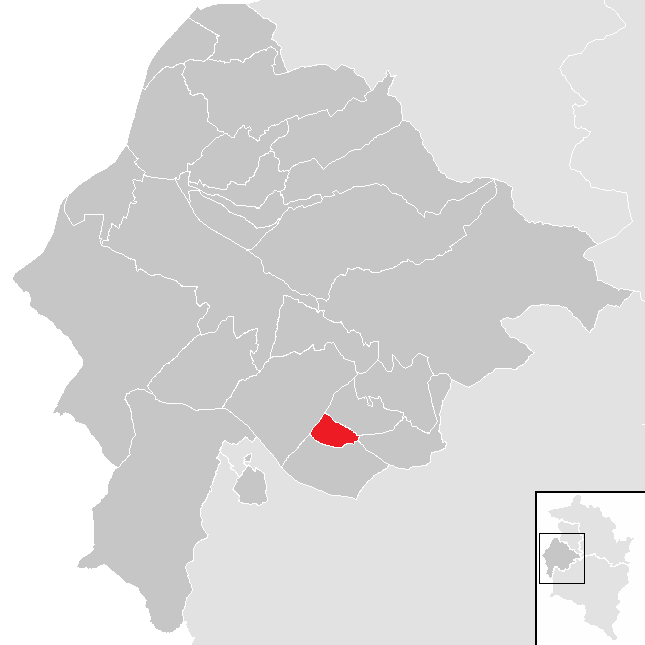
- Location in the district

- Location within Austria
- Coordinates: 47°13′00″N 09°42′00″E
- Country: Austria
- State: Vorarlberg
- District: Feldkirch

Government
  - Mayor: Michael Ammann

Area
  - Total: 1.45 km^{2} (0.56 sq mi)
- Elevation: 610 m (2,000 ft)

Population (2018-01-01)
  - Total: 352
  - Density: 243/km^{2} (629/sq mi)
- Time zone: UTC+1 (CET)
  - Summer (DST): UTC+2 (CEST)
- Postal code: 6822
- Area code: 05524
- Vehicle registration: FK
- Website: www.roens.at

Röns is a municipality in the district of Feldkirch in the Austrian state of Vorarlberg.

== Population ==
Historical population
Year	Pop.	±%
1869	127	—
1880	124	−2.4%
1890	144	+16.1%
1900	133	−7.6%
1910	150	+12.8%
1923	154	+2.7%
1934	143	−7.1%
1939	128	−10.5%
1951	151	+18.0%
1961	147	−2.6%
1971	203	+38.1%
1981	236	+16.3%
1991	274	+16.1%
2001	289	+5.5%
2011	317	+9.7%
