= Dünserberg =

- Municipality
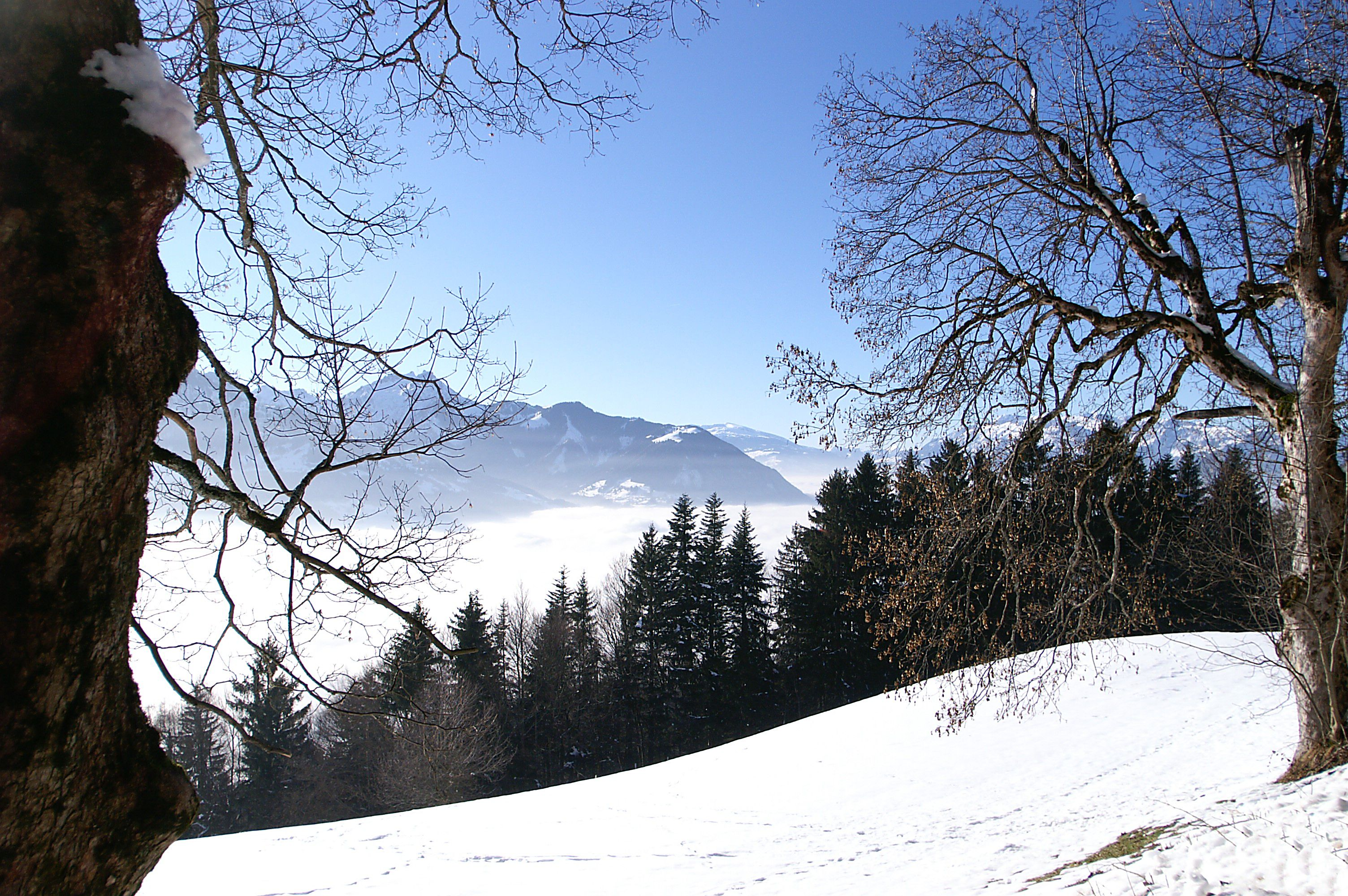

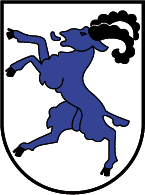
- Coat of arms

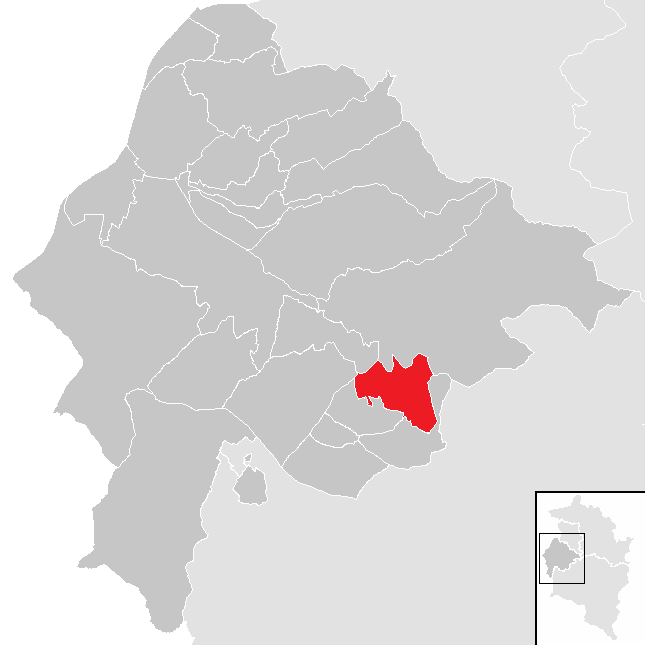
- Location within Feldkirch district

- Location within Austria
- Coordinates: 47°14′08″N 09°42′36″E
- Country: Austria
- State: Vorarlberg
- District: Feldkirch

Government
  - Mayor: Walter Rauch

Area
  - Total: 5.55 km^{2} (2.14 sq mi)
- Elevation: 1,270 m (4,170 ft)

Population (2018-01-01)
  - Total: 147
  - Density: 26.5/km^{2} (68.6/sq mi)
- Time zone: UTC+1 (CET)
  - Summer (DST): UTC+2 (CEST)
- Postal code: 6822
- Area code: 05524
- Vehicle registration: FK
- Website: www.duenserberg.at

Dünserberg is a municipality in the district of Feldkirch in the Austrian state of Vorarlberg.

At Dünserberg, there is an 89-metre-tall (292 ft) broadcasting tower for FM and TV built of concrete.

== Geography ==
Dünserberg is the smallest municipality in Vorarlberg. About 46 percent of the municipality is forest, and 20 percent is mountainous.

== Population ==
Historical population
Year	Pop.	±%
1869	22	—
1880	130	+490.9%
1890	131	+0.8%
1900	127	−3.1%
1910	117	−7.9%
1923	103	−12.0%
1934	117	+13.6%
1939	113	−3.4%
1951	109	−3.5%
1961	116	+6.4%
1971	134	+15.5%
1981	128	−4.5%
1991	171	+33.6%
2001	147	−14.0%
2011	145	−1.4%
