= Schnifis =

- Municipality
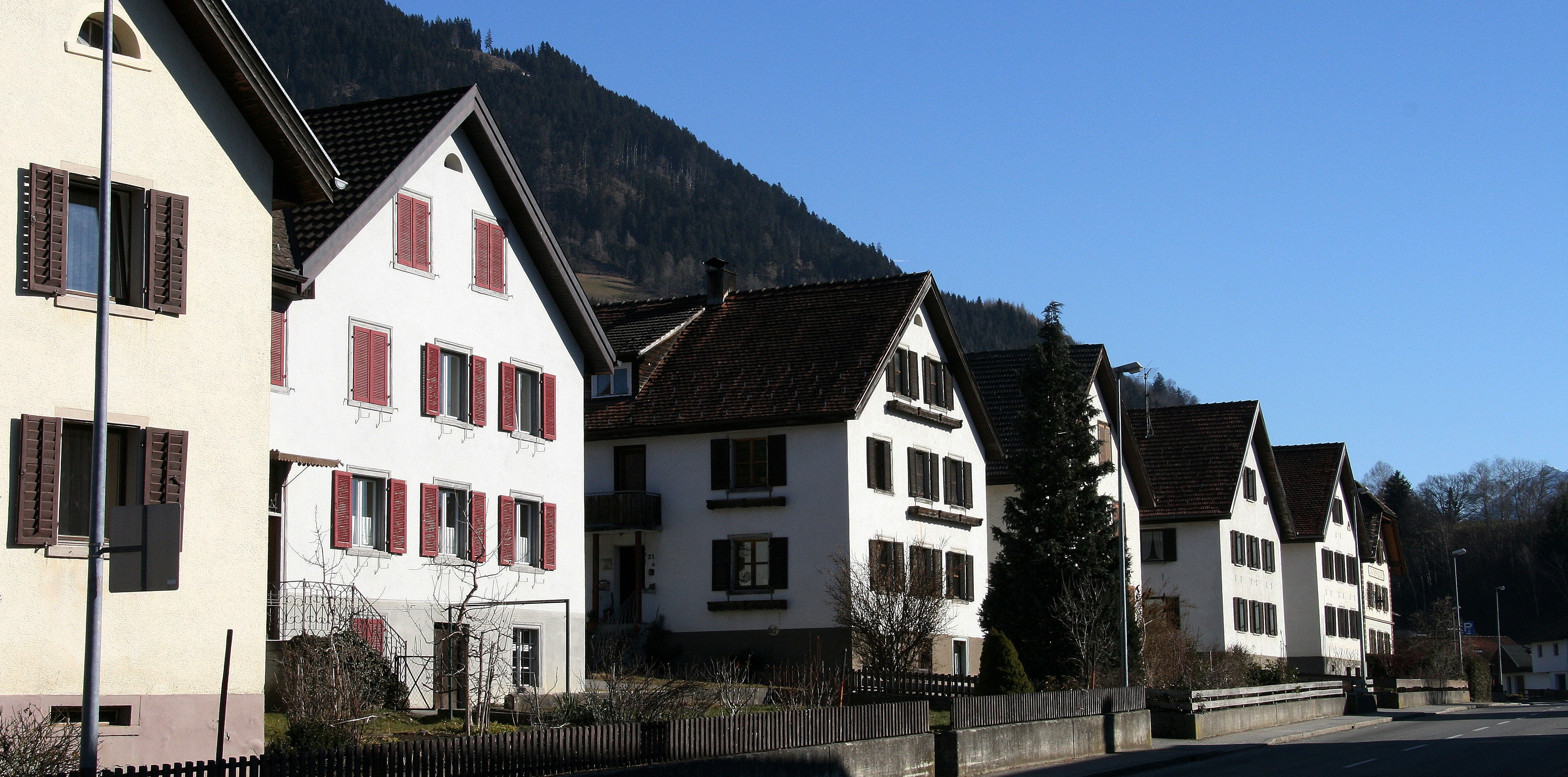

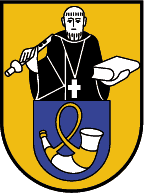
- Coat of arms

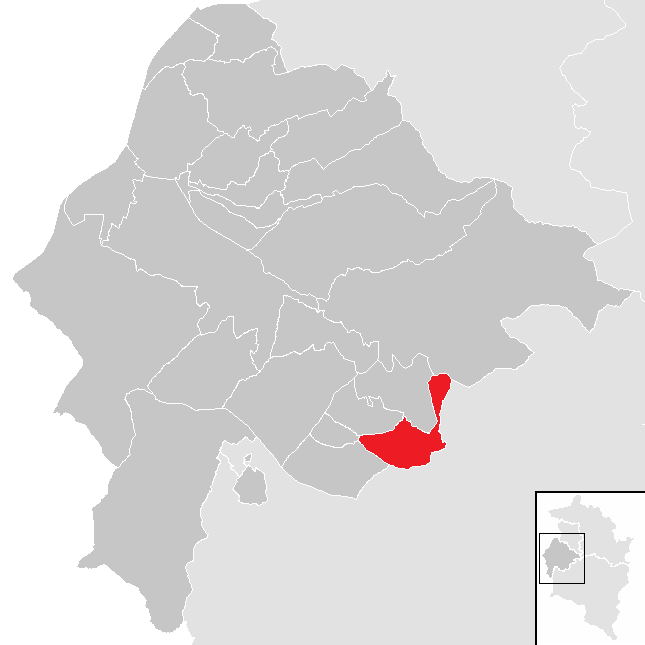
- Location in the district

- Location within Austria
- Coordinates: 47°13′00″N 09°43′00″E
- Country: Austria
- State: Vorarlberg
- District: Feldkirch

Government
  - Mayor: Anton Mähr

Area
  - Total: 4.87 km^{2} (1.88 sq mi)
- Elevation: 657 m (2,156 ft)

Population (2018-01-01)
  - Total: 798
  - Density: 164/km^{2} (424/sq mi)
- Time zone: UTC+1 (CET)
  - Summer (DST): UTC+2 (CEST)
- Postal code: 6822
- Area code: 05524
- Vehicle registration: FK
- Website: www.schnifis.at

Schnifis is a municipality in the district of Feldkirch in the Austrian state of Vorarlberg.

== Population ==
Historical population
Year	Pop.	±%
1869	379	—
1880	386	+1.8%
1890	379	−1.8%
1900	399	+5.3%
1910	379	−5.0%
1923	390	+2.9%
1934	449	+15.1%
1939	442	−1.6%
1951	418	−5.4%
1961	442	+5.7%
1971	490	+10.9%
1981	567	+15.7%
1991	637	+12.3%
2001	706	+10.8%
2011	756	+7.1%
