= Düns =

- Municipality
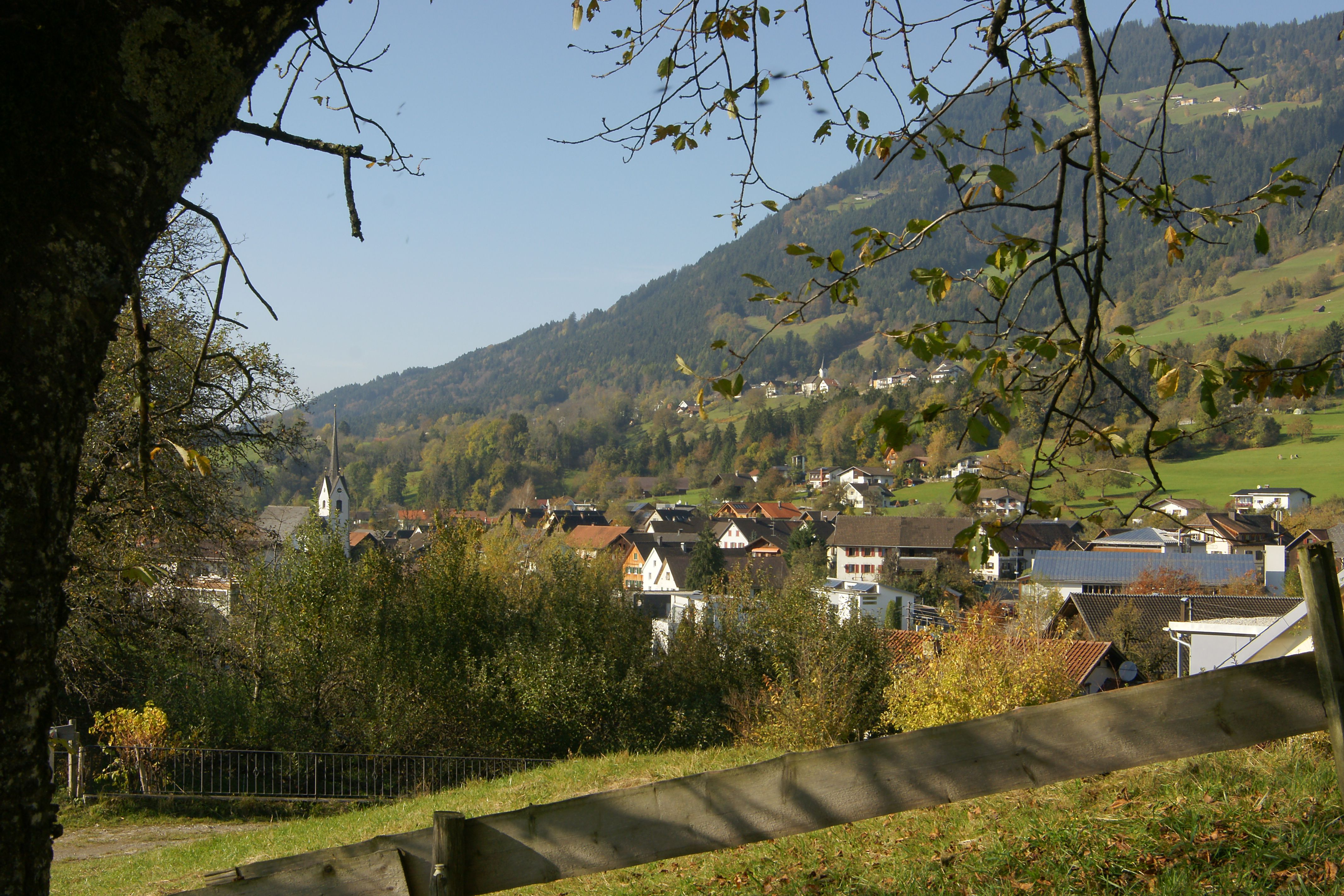

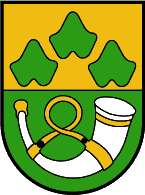
- Coat of arms

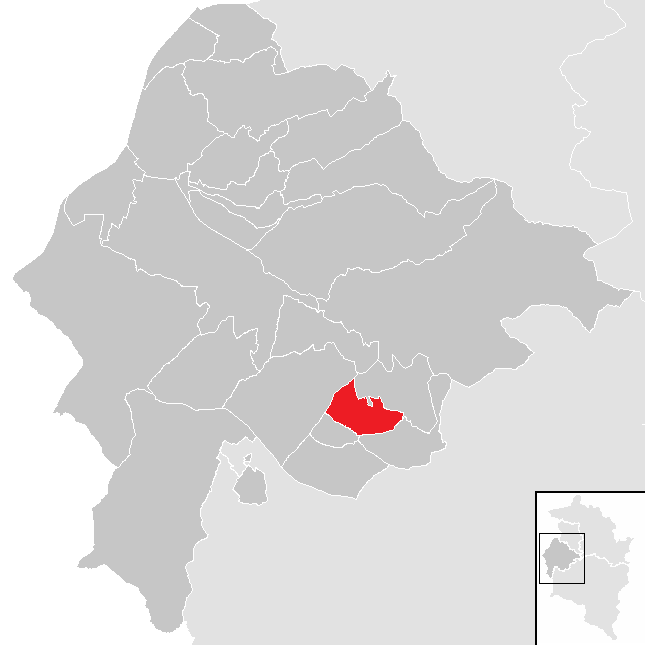
- Location in the district

- Location within Austria
- Coordinates: 47°13′20″N 09°43′00″E
- Country: Austria
- State: Vorarlberg
- District: Feldkirch

Government
  - Mayor: Gerold Mähr

Area
  - Total: 3.46 km^{2} (1.34 sq mi)
- Elevation: 753 m (2,470 ft)

Population (2018-01-01)
  - Total: 411
  - Density: 119/km^{2} (308/sq mi)
- Time zone: UTC+1 (CET)
  - Summer (DST): UTC+2 (CEST)
- Postal code: 6822
- Area code: 05524
- Vehicle registration: FK
- Website: www.duens.at

Düns is a municipality in the district of Feldkirch in the Austrian state of Vorarlberg.

== Population ==
Historical population
Year	Pop.	±%
1869	235	—
1880	206	−12.3%
1890	212	+2.9%
1900	187	−11.8%
1910	188	+0.5%
1923	214	+13.8%
1934	253	+18.2%
1939	250	−1.2%
1951	259	+3.6%
1961	224	−13.5%
1971	255	+13.8%
1981	295	+15.7%
1991	347	+17.6%
2001	385	+11.0%
2011	382	−0.8%
