= Meiningen, Austria =

Meiningen Moanege
- Municipality
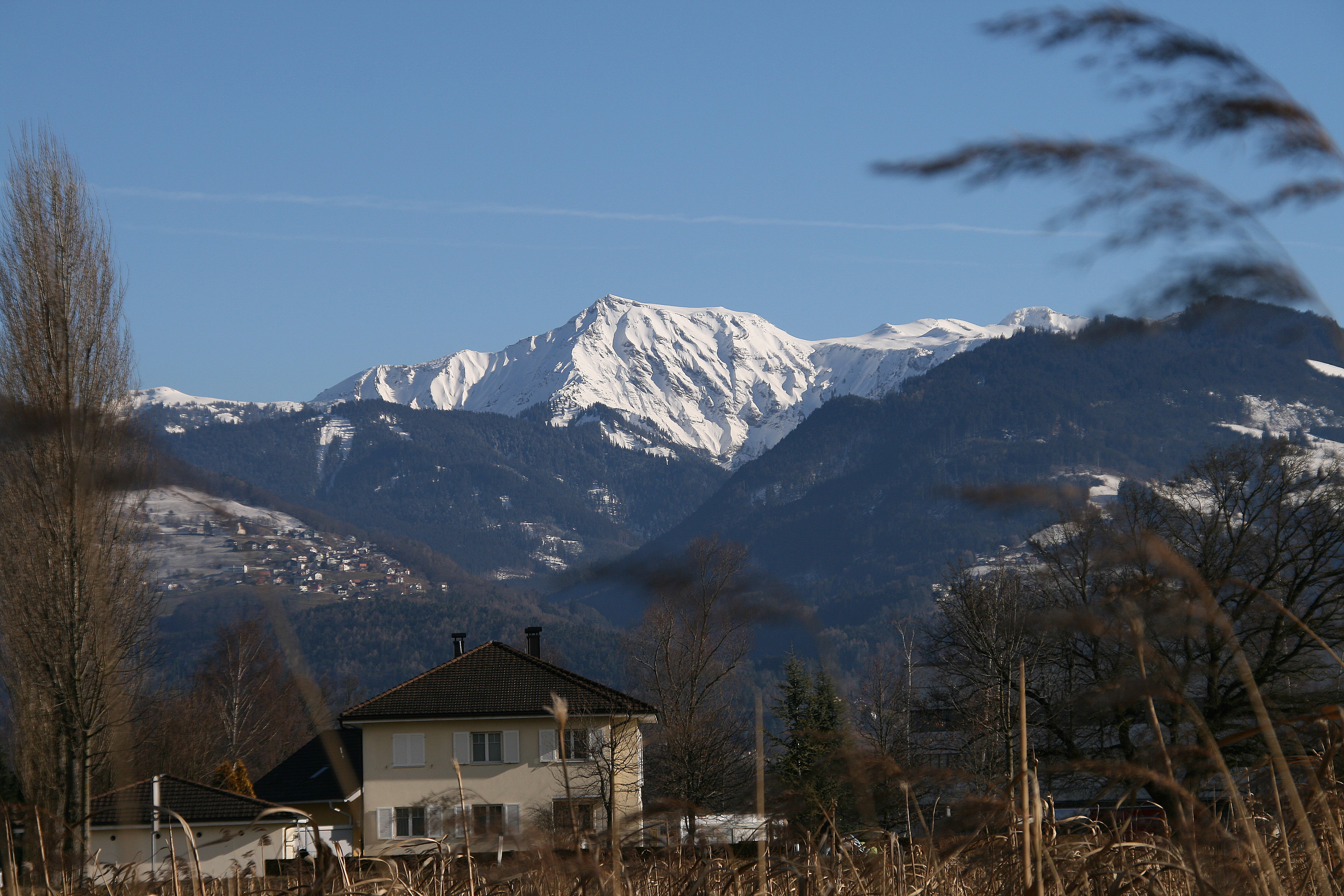

- Coat of arms

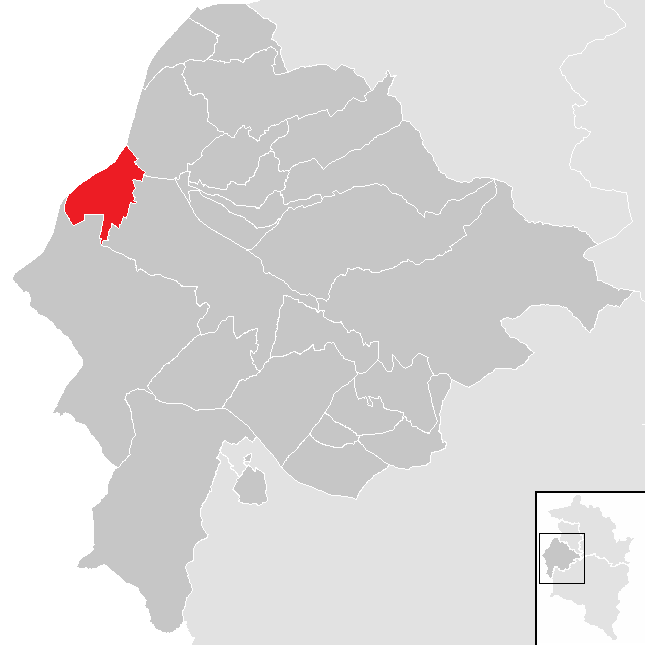
- Location in the district

- Location within Austria
- Coordinates: 47°18′00″N 09°35′00″E
- Country: Austria
- State: Vorarlberg
- District: Feldkirch

Government
  - Mayor: Thomas Pinter (ÖVP)

Area
  - Total: 5.37 km^{2} (2.07 sq mi)
- Elevation: 425 m (1,394 ft)

Population (2018-01-01)
  - Total: 2,245
  - Density: 418/km^{2} (1,080/sq mi)
- Time zone: UTC+1 (CET)
  - Summer (DST): UTC+2 (CEST)
- Postal code: 6812
- Area code: 05522
- Vehicle registration: FK
- Website: www.meiningen.at

Meiningen (High Alemannic: Moanege) is a municipality in the district of Feldkirch in the Austrian state of Vorarlberg.

== Population ==
Historical population
Year	Pop.	±%
1869	400	—
1880	412	+3.0%
1890	429	+4.1%
1900	419	−2.3%
1910	448	+6.9%
1923	459	+2.5%
1934	479	+4.4%
1939	447	−6.7%
1951	563	+26.0%
1961	672	+19.4%
1971	981	+46.0%
1981	1,284	+30.9%
1991	1,590	+23.8%
2001	1,872	+17.7%
2011	2,014	+7.6%
