= Fraxern =

- Municipality
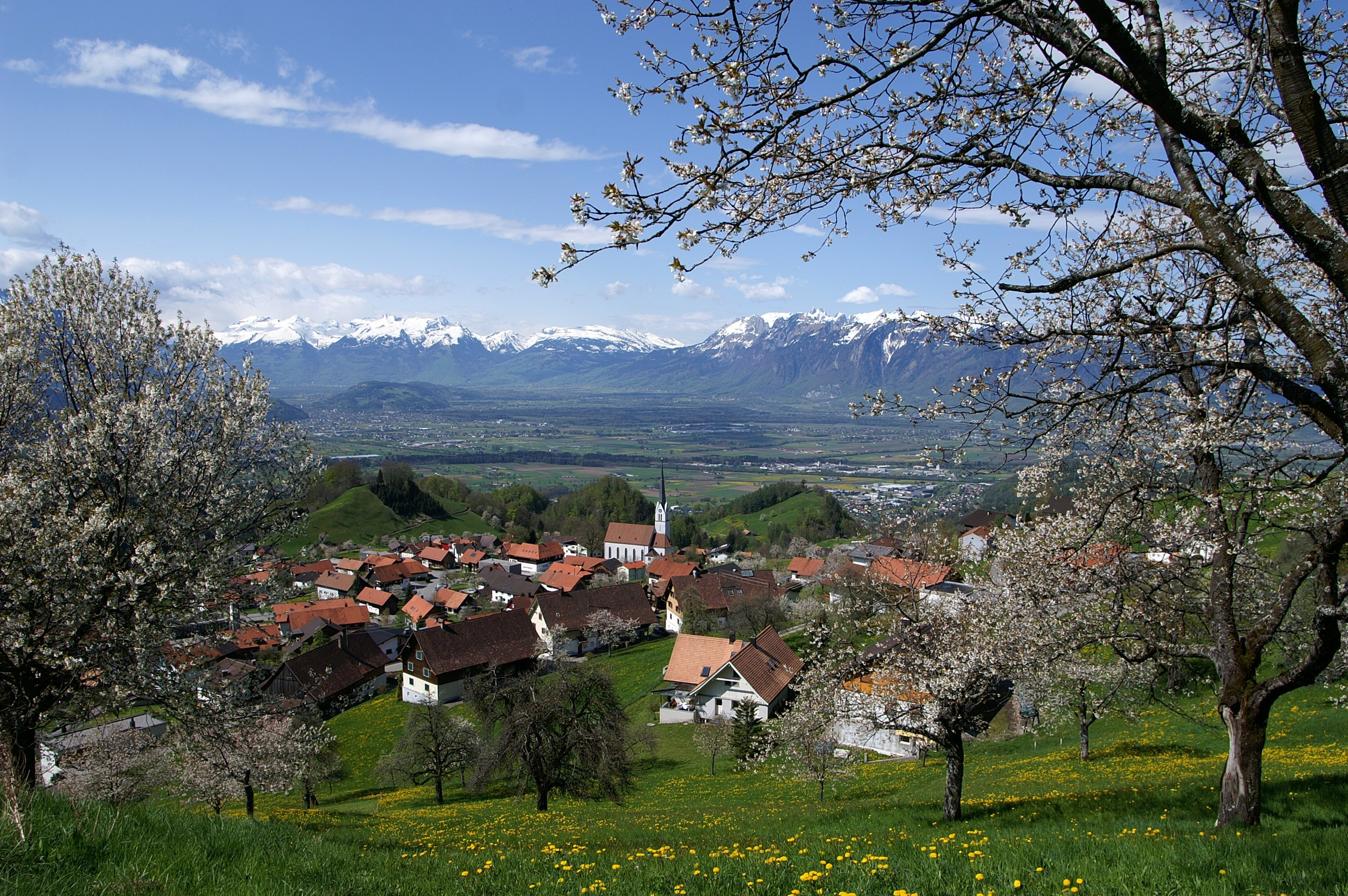

- Coat of arms

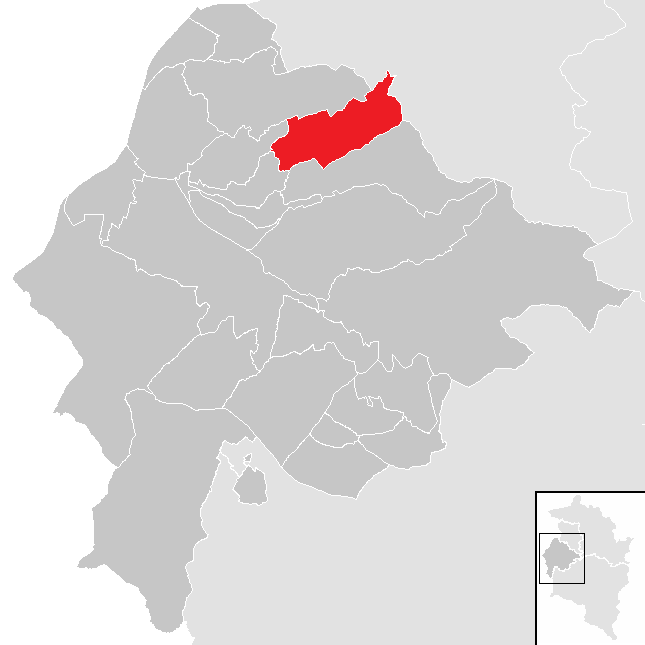
- Location in the district

- Location within Austria
- Coordinates: 47°19′N 09°40′E
- Country: Austria
- State: Vorarlberg
- District: Feldkirch

Government
  - Mayor: Steve Mayr

Area
  - Total: 8.87 km^{2} (3.42 sq mi)
- Elevation: 817 m (2,680 ft)

Population (2018-01-01)
  - Total: 701
  - Density: 79.0/km^{2} (205/sq mi)
- Time zone: UTC+1 (CET)
  - Summer (DST): UTC+2 (CEST)
- Postal code: 6833
- Website: http://www.tisvover.at/fraxern/

Fraxern is a municipality in the district of Feldkirch in the Austrian state of Vorarlberg.

Fraxern lies in the mountains next to Feldkirch at an altitude of 817 m. 54.6 % of the municipality is covered by forest and 26.7 % are meadows.

The first written mention of Fraxern ("Fraxnara", meaning ash), dates back to 1127.

== Population ==
Historical population
Year	Pop.	±%
1869	341	—
1880	367	+7.6%
1890	356	−3.0%
1900	373	+4.8%
1910	400	+7.2%
1923	413	+3.2%
1934	411	−0.5%
1939	394	−4.1%
1951	430	+9.1%
1961	473	+10.0%
1971	484	+2.3%
1981	519	+7.2%
1991	592	+14.1%
2001	659	+11.3%
2011	674	+2.3%
2012	671	−0.4%
2013	660	−1.6%
2014	656	−0.6%
2015	687	+4.7%
