= Amtsgericht Meiningen =

Coordinates: 50°34′44″N 10°25′11″E

Amtsgericht Meiningen is the District Court of Meiningen and one of 23 district courts in Thuringia, Germany. It has 23 judges and 40 employees in mid-service, 19 employees in the elevated service and seven bailiffs.

The district court of Meiningen was the first founded in October 1879 as one of 16 district courts in the Duchy of Saxe-Meiningen. Until 1945 it was located in the building of the district court in Meiningen in Bismarckstraße 14 (now Neu-Ulmer-Straße). After its destruction in February 1945 by a bomb attack, the judicial authority moved location. On 3 June 1995 an arson attack took place in the district court building, destroying many records. The district court was then moved to a large building on Charlottenstraße.
