= Satteins =

- Municipality
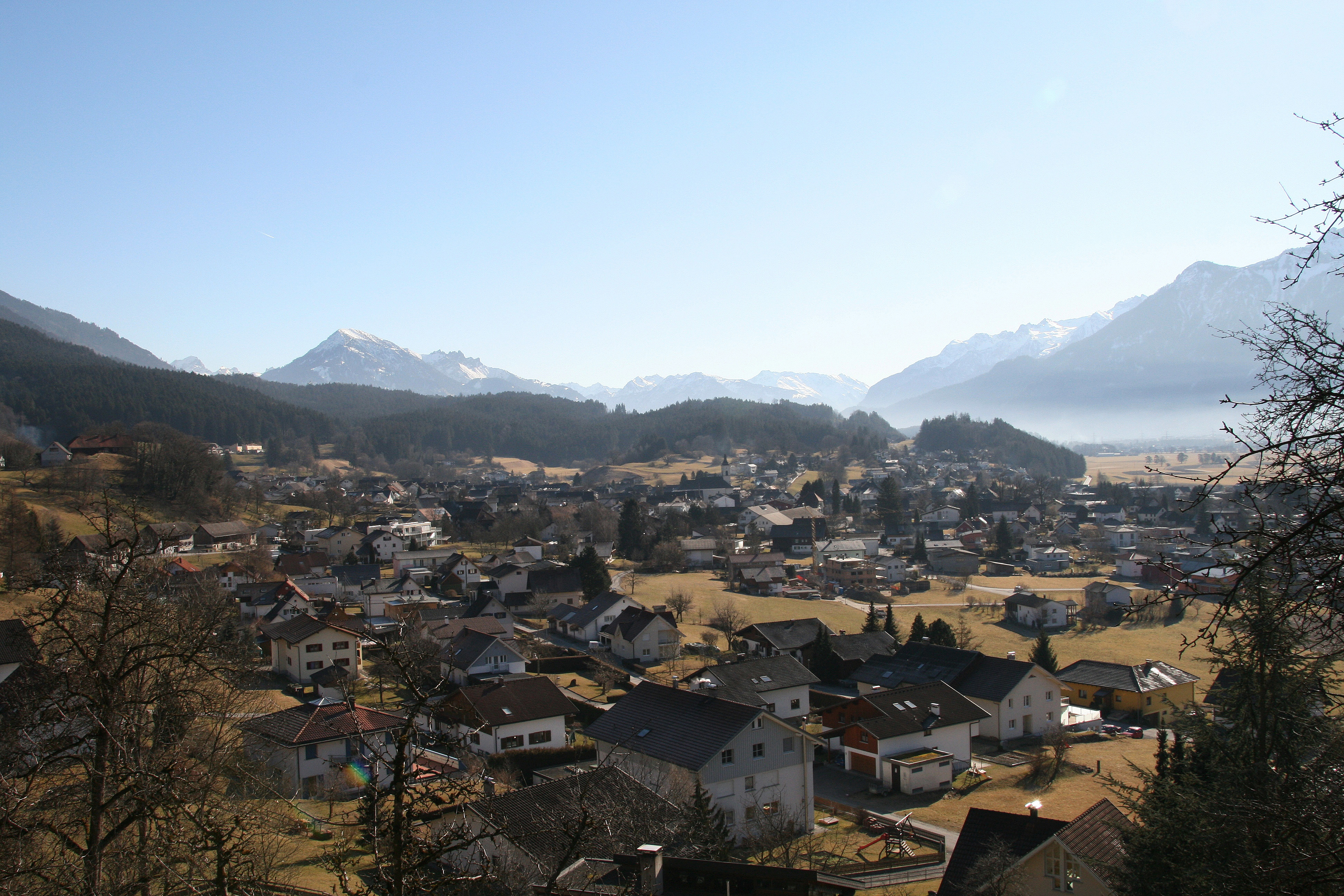

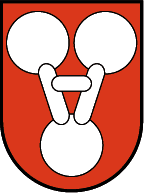
- Coat of arms

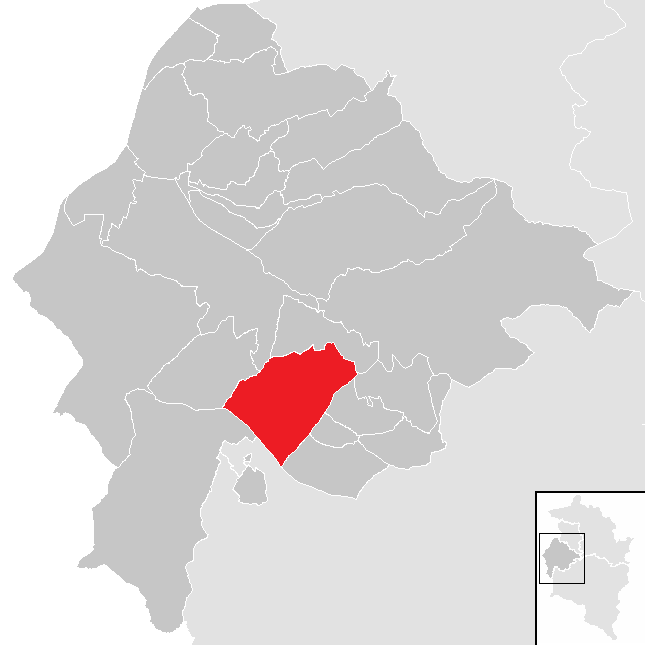
- Location in the district

- Location within Austria
- Coordinates: 47°13′00″N 09°40′00″E
- Country: Austria
- State: Vorarlberg
- District: Feldkirch

Government
  - Mayor: Anton Metzler

Area
  - Total: 12.7 km^{2} (4.9 sq mi)
- Elevation: 495 m (1,624 ft)

Population (2018-01-01)
  - Total: 2,703
  - Density: 213/km^{2} (551/sq mi)
- Time zone: UTC+1 (CET)
  - Summer (DST): UTC+2 (CEST)
- Postal code: 6822
- Area code: 05524
- Vehicle registration: FK
- Website: www.satteins.net

Satteins is a town in the Austrian state of Vorarlberg.

== Population ==
Historical population
Year	Pop.	±%
1869	890	—
1880	996	+11.9%
1890	896	−10.0%
1900	916	+2.2%
1910	1,080	+17.9%
1923	1,054	−2.4%
1934	1,114	+5.7%
1939	1,103	−1.0%
1951	1,347	+22.1%
1961	1,604	+19.1%
1971	2,002	+24.8%
1981	2,155	+7.6%
1991	2,240	+3.9%
2001	2,435	+8.7%
2011	2,558	+5.1%
