= Übersaxen =

- Municipality
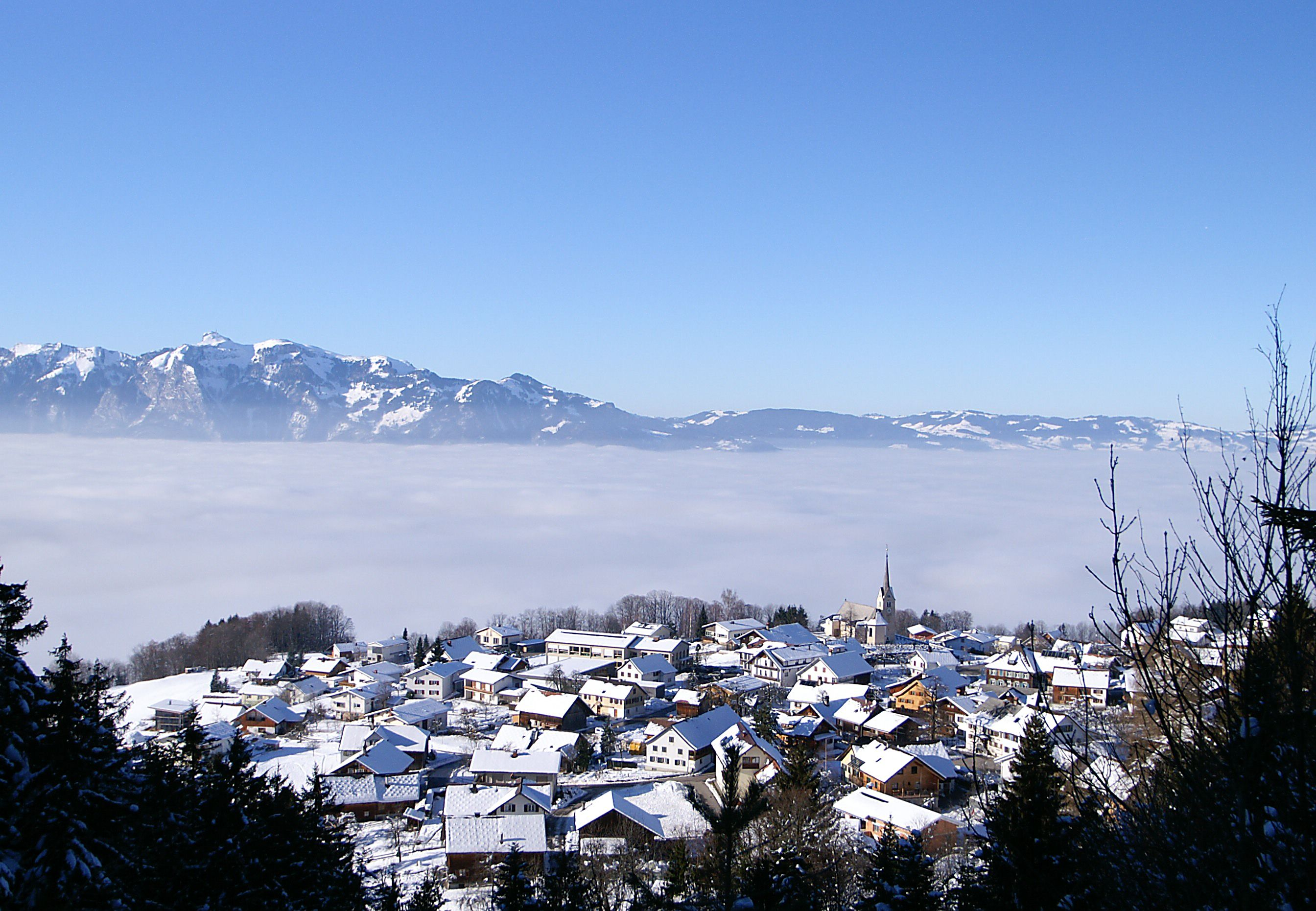

- Coat of arms

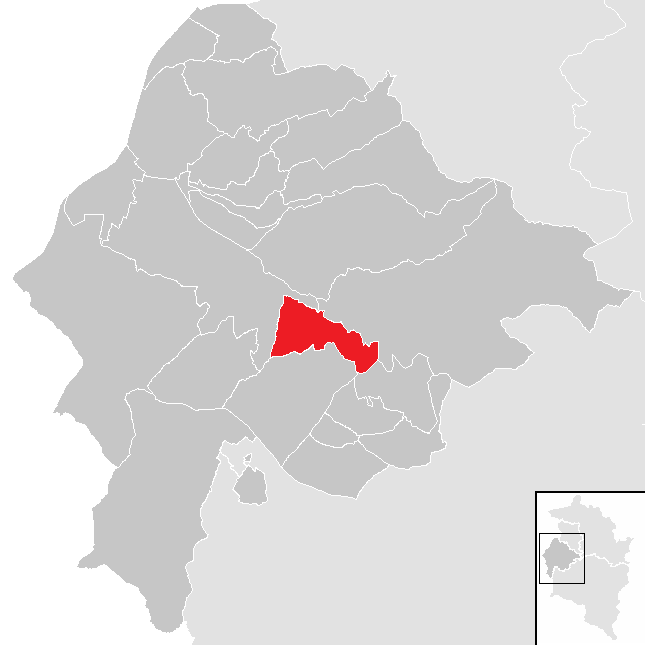
- Location in the district

- Location within Austria
- Coordinates: 47°15′00″N 09°40′00″E
- Country: Austria
- State: Vorarlberg
- District: Feldkirch

Government
  - Mayor: Rainer Duelli

Area
  - Total: 5.76 km^{2} (2.22 sq mi)
- Elevation: 899 m (2,949 ft)

Population (2018-01-01)
  - Total: 629
  - Density: 109/km^{2} (283/sq mi)
- Time zone: UTC+1 (CET)
  - Summer (DST): UTC+2 (CEST)
- Postal code: 6834
- Area code: 05522
- Vehicle registration: FK
- Website: www.uebersaxen.at

Übersaxen is a municipality in the district of Feldkirch in the Austrian state of Vorarlberg.

== Population ==
Historical population
Year	Pop.	±%
1869	278	—
1880	291	+4.7%
1890	331	+13.7%
1900	322	−2.7%
1910	322	+0.0%
1923	366	+13.7%
1934	366	+0.0%
1939	336	−8.2%
1951	406	+20.8%
1961	413	+1.7%
1971	479	+16.0%
1981	492	+2.7%
1991	520	+5.7%
2001	567	+9.0%
2011	616	+8.6%
