= Mäder =

- Municipality
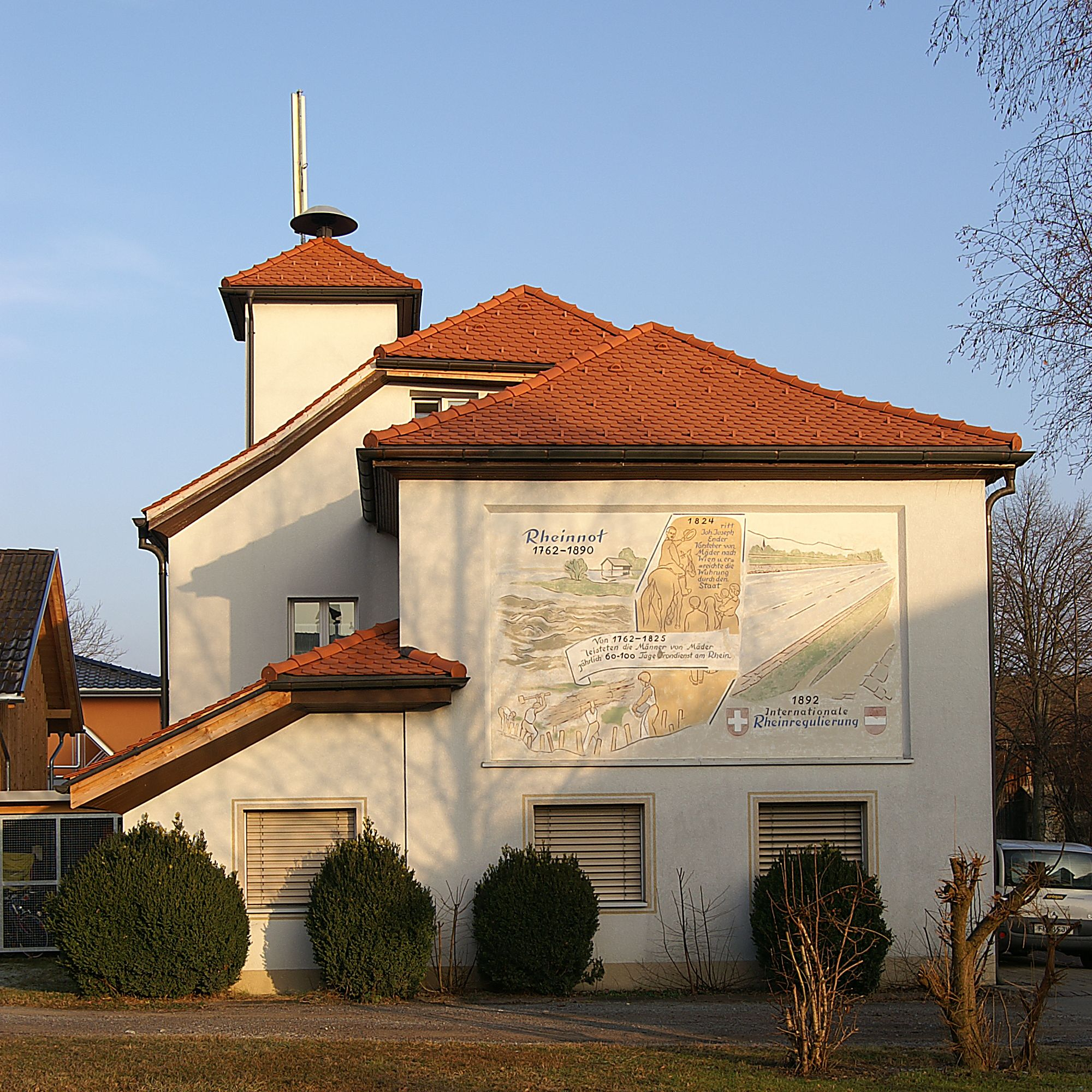

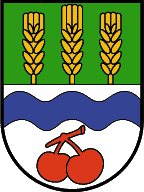
- Coat of arms

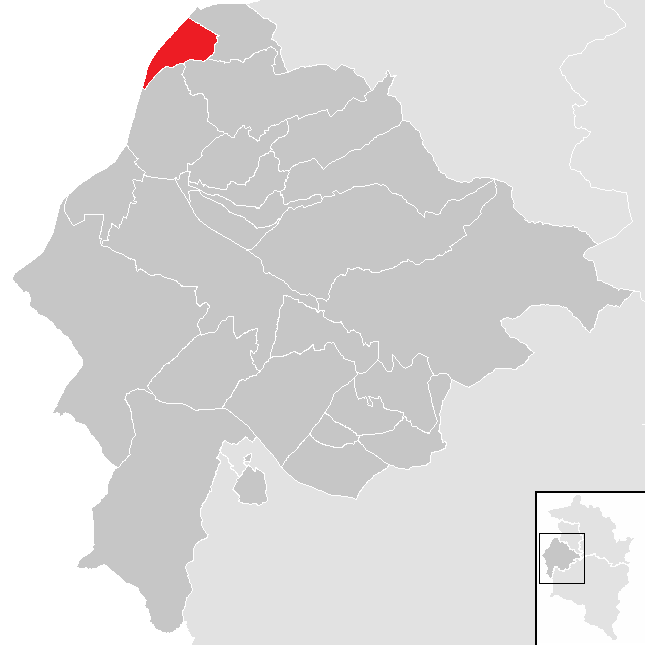
- Location in the district

- Location within Austria
- Coordinates: 47°21′00″N 09°37′00″E
- Country: Austria
- State: Vorarlberg
- District: Feldkirch

Government
  - Mayor: Rainer Siegele

Area
  - Total: 3.39 km^{2} (1.31 sq mi)
- Elevation: 414 m (1,358 ft)

Population (2018-01-01)
  - Total: 4,031
  - Density: 1,190/km^{2} (3,080/sq mi)
- Time zone: UTC+1 (CET)
  - Summer (DST): UTC+2 (CEST)
- Postal code: 6841
- Area code: 05523
- Vehicle registration: FK
- Website: www.maeder.at

Mäder is a municipality in the district of Feldkirch in the Austrian state of Vorarlberg.

== Population ==
Historical population
Year	Pop.	±%
1869	547	—
1880	623	+13.9%
1890	636	+2.1%
1900	595	−6.4%
1910	705	+18.5%
1923	653	−7.4%
1934	681	+4.3%
1939	658	−3.4%
1951	786	+19.5%
1961	960	+22.1%
1971	1,619	+68.6%
1981	2,239	+38.3%
1991	2,724	+21.7%
2001	3,142	+15.3%
2011	3,683	+17.2%
