= Göfis =

- Municipality
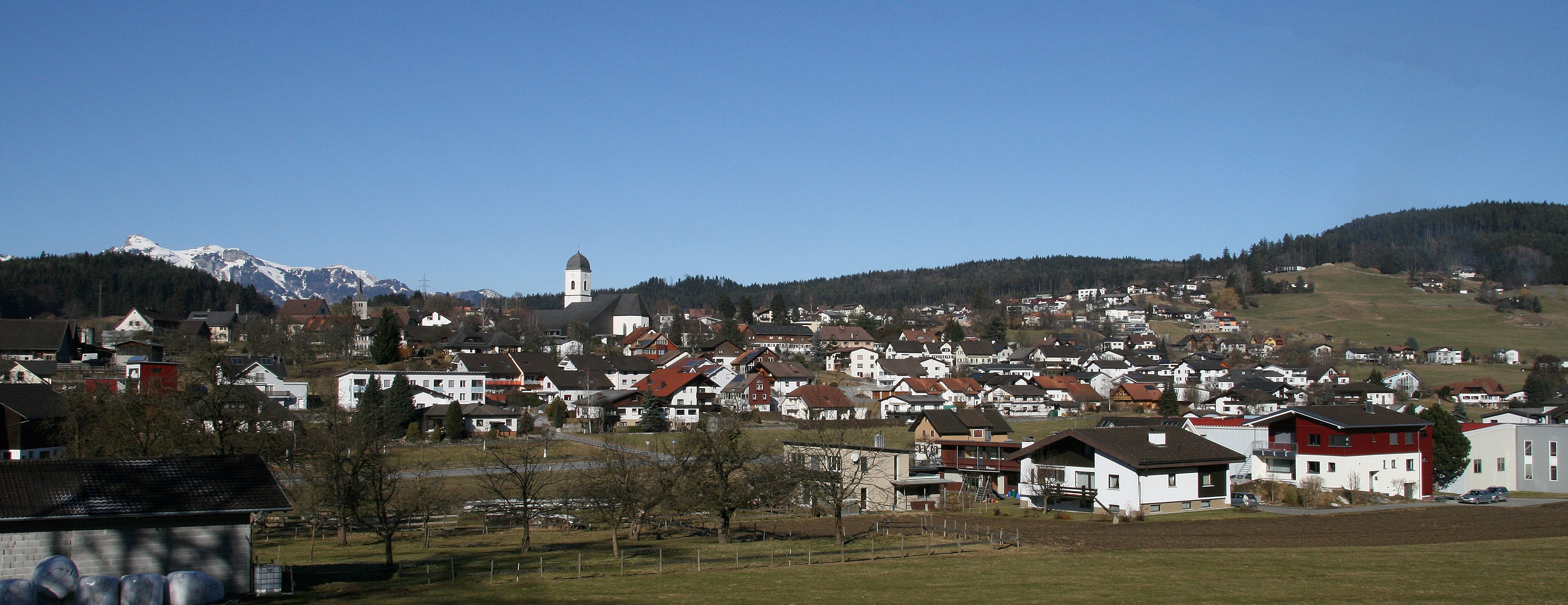

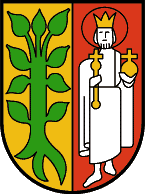
- Coat of arms

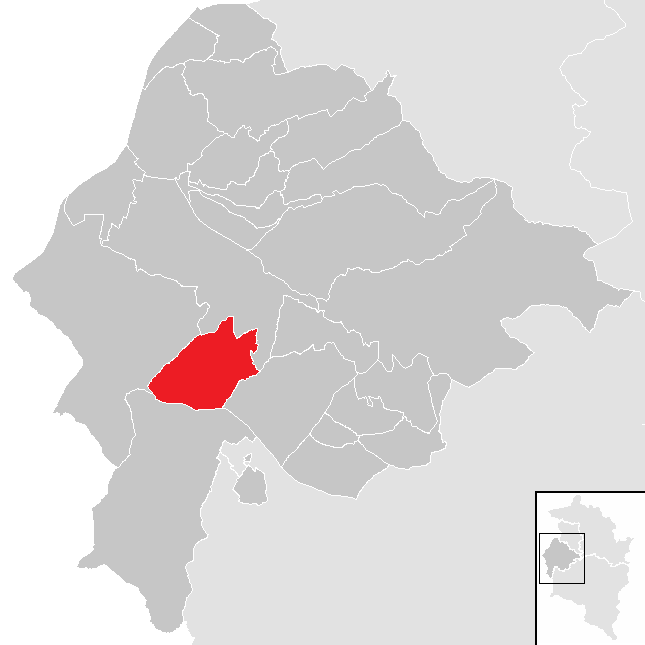
- Location in the district

- Location within Austria Göfis (Austria)
- Coordinates: 47°13′59″N 09°37′59″E
- Country: Austria
- State: Vorarlberg
- District: Feldkirch

Government
  - Mayor: Helmut Lampert (ÖVP)

Area
  - Total: 9.07 km^{2} (3.50 sq mi)
- Elevation: 558 m (1,831 ft)

Population (2018-01-01)
  - Total: 3,312
  - Density: 365/km^{2} (946/sq mi)
- Time zone: UTC+1 (CET)
  - Summer (DST): UTC+2 (CEST)
- Postal code: 6811
- Area code: 05522
- Vehicle registration: FK
- Website: www.goefis.at

Göfis is a municipality in the district of Feldkirch in the Austrian state of Vorarlberg.

== Population ==
Historical population
| Year | Pop. | ±% |
|---|---|---|
| 1869 | 972 | — |
| 1880 | 972 | +0.0% |
| 1890 | 1,000 | +2.9% |
| 1900 | 993 | −0.7% |
| 1910 | 1,042 | +4.9% |
| 1923 | 1,071 | +2.8% |
| 1934 | 1,183 | +10.5% |
| 1939 | 1,145 | −3.2% |
| 1951 | 1,366 | +19.3% |
| 1961 | 1,656 | +21.2% |
| 1971 | 2,089 | +26.1% |
| 1981 | 2,433 | +16.5% |
| 1991 | 2,715 | +11.6% |
| 2001 | 2,862 | +5.4% |
| 2011 | 3,015 | +5.3% |
| 2021 | 3,556 | +17.9% |
