= Feldkirch District =

Coordinates: 47.279°N 9.664°E

Feldkirch District Bezirk Feldkirch
- District
- Country: Austria
- State: Vorarlberg
- Number of municipalities: 24
- Administrative seat: Feldkirch

Government
  - District Governor: Herbert Burtscher

Area
  - Total: 278.26 km^{2} (107.44 sq mi)

Population (2012)
  - Total: 100,656
  - Density: 361.73/km^{2} (936.89/sq mi)
- Time zone: UTC+01:00 (CET)
  - Summer (DST): UTC+02:00 (CEST)
- Vehicle registration: FK

The Bezirk Feldkirch is an administrative district (Bezirk) in Vorarlberg, Austria.

Area of the district is 278.26 km^{2}, population is 100,656 (2012), and population density 362 persons per km^{2}. Administrative center of the district is Feldkirch.

Historical population
Year	Pop.	±%
1869	23,279	—
1880	25,241	+8.4%
1890	27,083	+7.3%
1900	30,385	+12.2%
1910	35,003	+15.2%
1923	34,090	−2.6%
1934	37,580	+10.2%
1939	38,142	+1.5%
1951	45,427	+19.1%
1961	54,520	+20.0%
1971	70,329	+29.0%
1981	78,007	+10.9%
1991	86,278	+10.6%
2001	93,600	+8.5%
2011	99,936	+6.8%
Source: Statistik Austria

== Administrative divisions ==
The district is divided into 24 municipalities, one of them is a town, and three of them are market towns.

=== Towns ===
1. Feldkirch (31,054)

=== Market towns ===
1. Frastanz (6,274)
2. Götzis (10,795)
3. Rankweil (11,635)

=== Municipalities ===
1. Altach (6,397)
2. Düns (377)
3. Dünserberg (147)
4. Fraxern (677)
5. Göfis (3,083)
6. Klaus (3,102)
7. Koblach (4,269)
8. Laterns (678)
9. Mäder (3,739)
10. Meiningen (2,035)
11. Röns (314)
12. Röthis (1,922)
13. Satteins (2,590)
14. Schlins (2,271)
15. Schnifis (762)
16. Sulz (2,390)
17. Übersaxen (629)
18. Viktorsberg (389)
19. Weiler (2,022)
20. Zwischenwasser (3,105)

(population numbers as of January 1, 2012)
