= Röthis =

- Municipality
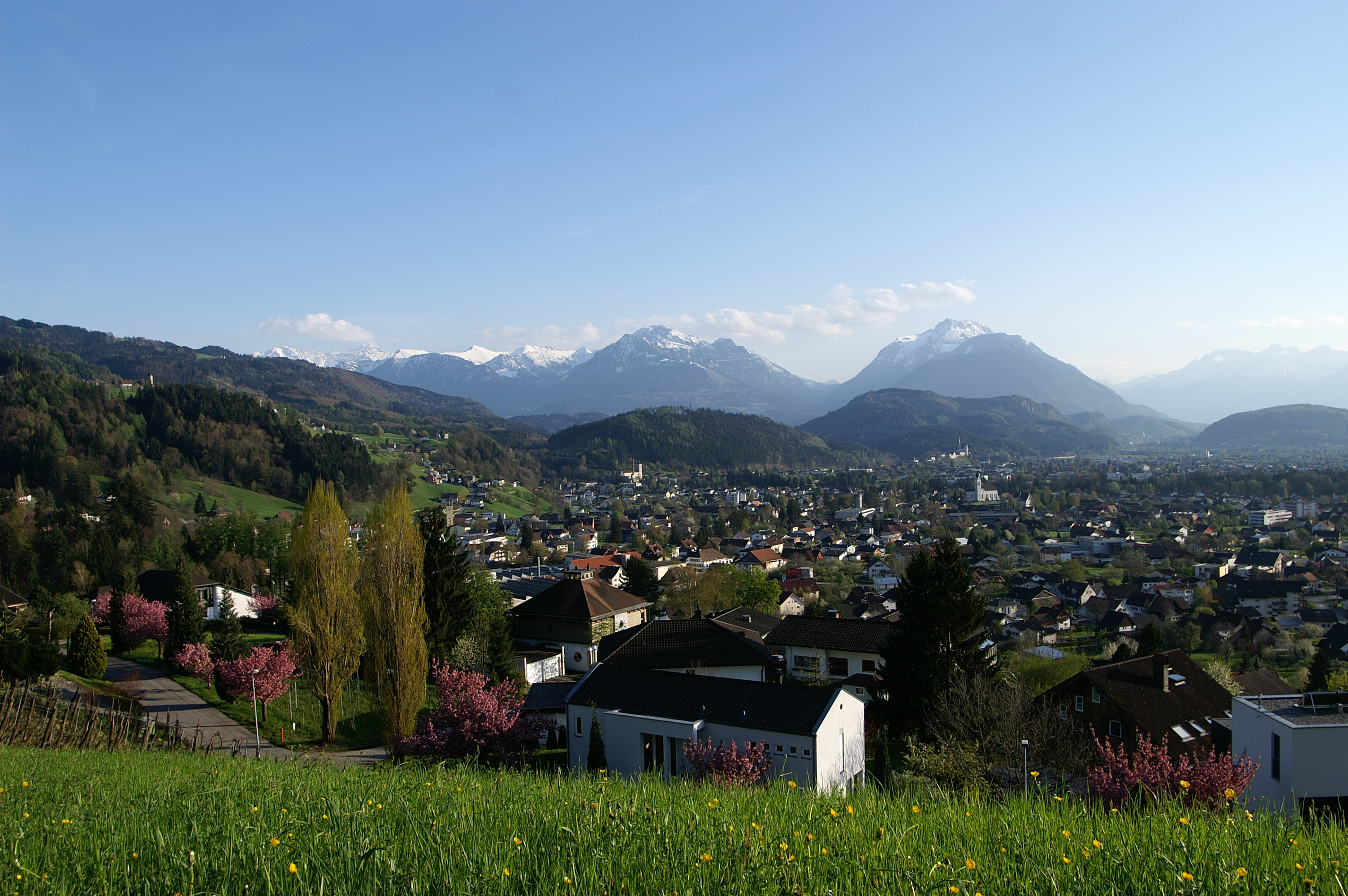

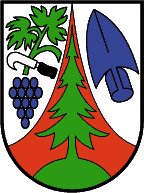
- Coat of arms

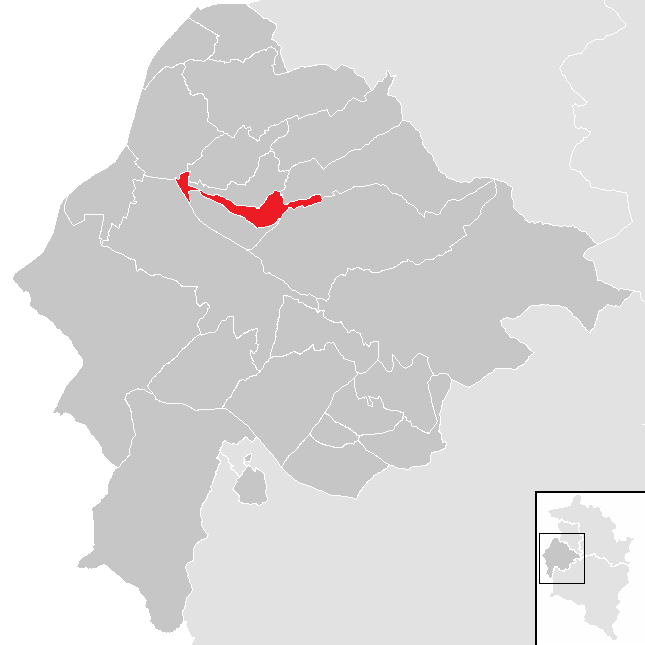
- Location in the district

- Location within Austria
- Coordinates: 47°17′30″N 09°39′50″E
- Country: Austria
- State: Vorarlberg
- District: Feldkirch

Government
  - Mayor: Roman Kopf

Area
  - Total: 2.73 km^{2} (1.05 sq mi)
- Elevation: 508 m (1,667 ft)

Population (2018-01-01)
  - Total: 1,942
  - Density: 711/km^{2} (1,840/sq mi)
- Time zone: UTC+1 (CET)
  - Summer (DST): UTC+2 (CEST)
- Postal code: 6832
- Area code: 05522
- Vehicle registration: FK
- Website: www.roethis.at

Röthis is a municipality in the district of Feldkirch in the Austrian state of Vorarlberg.

== Name ==
The name of Röthis was first recorded as Roetis around 1380 in a bailiff's register in Chur. Other spellings included Rötis, Roetys, Reottis, and Röttis. The spelling Röthis became common in the late 18th and 19th centuries.

== Geography ==
Röthis is located in Vorarlberg, western Austria, at an elevation of 508 metres. The Frutz forms the municipality's western boundary at about 440 metres above sea level, while the land rises to about 700 metres along the Frödisch in the southeast. The municipality covers just under 3 km², of which about 20% is used for agriculture and one-third is forested.

Röthis has no other cadastral communities.

== Population ==
Historical population
Year	Pop.	±%
1869	538	—
1880	541	+0.6%
1890	538	−0.6%
1900	632	+17.5%
1910	642	+1.6%
1923	600	−6.5%
1934	736	+22.7%
1939	749	+1.8%
1951	900	+20.2%
1961	1,157	+28.6%
1971	1,582	+36.7%
1981	1,860	+17.6%
1991	1,933	+3.9%
2001	1,997	+3.3%
2011	1,917	−4.0%

== Transport ==
Sulz-Röthis railway station is an intermediate station on the Vorarlberg railway line (Vorarlbergbahn) traversing Vorarlberg in a north-south direction. The railway station is called at by the S1 regional train service of Vorarlberg S-Bahn, operated by Austrian Federal Railways (ÖBB).
