= Laterns =

- Municipality
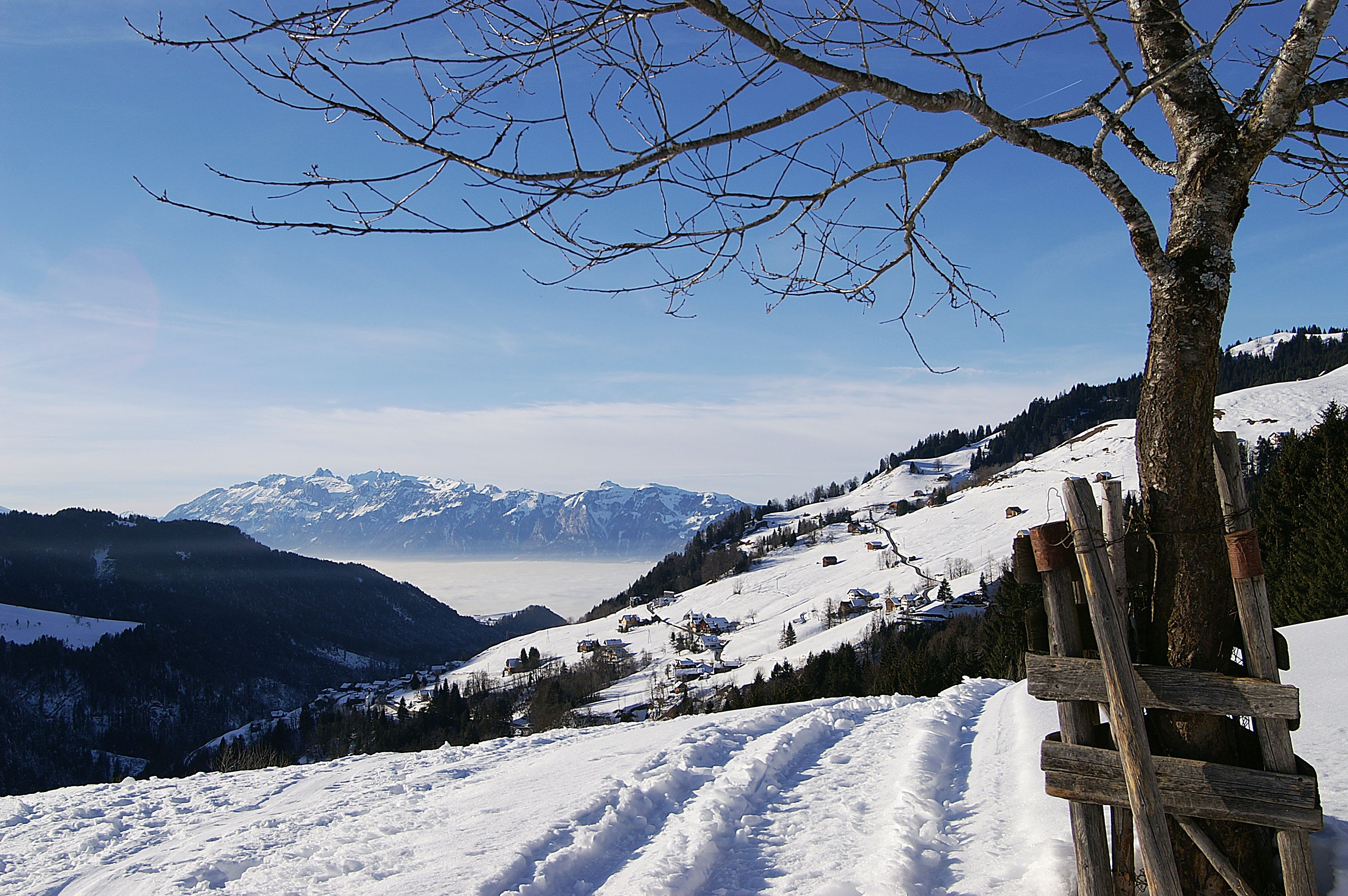

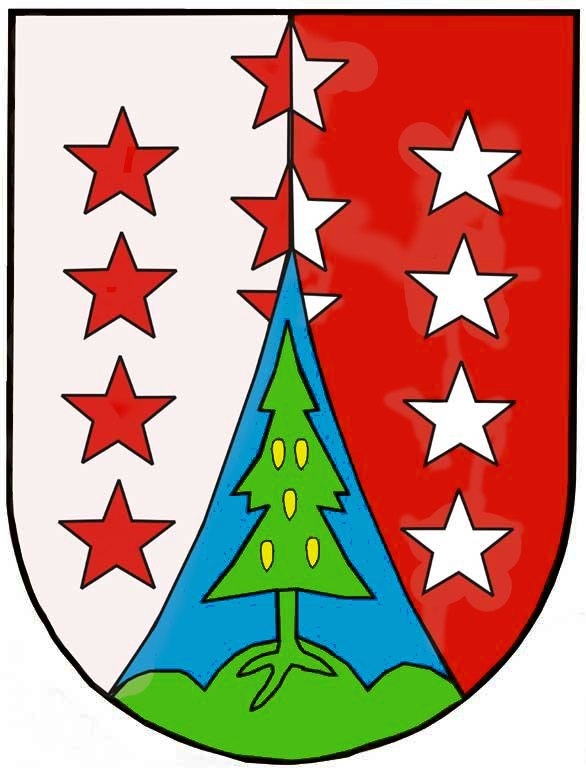
- Coat of arms

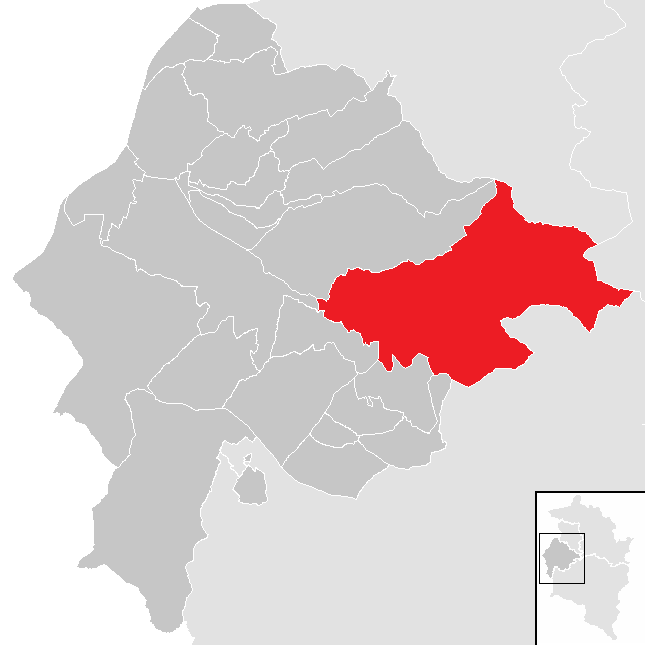
- Location in the district

- Location within Austria
- Coordinates: 47°16′N 09°42′E
- Country: Austria
- State: Vorarlberg
- District: Feldkirch

Government
  - Mayor: Gerold Welte

Area
  - Total: 43.79 km^{2} (16.91 sq mi)
- Elevation: 921 m (3,022 ft)

Population (2018-01-01)
  - Total: 662
  - Density: 15.1/km^{2} (39.2/sq mi)
- Time zone: UTC+1 (CET)
  - Summer (DST): UTC+2 (CEST)
- Postal code: 6830
- Website: www.laterns.at

Laterns is a municipality in the district of Feldkirch in the Austrian state of Vorarlberg.

== Population ==
Historical population

Year	Pop.	±%
1869	645	—
1880	646	+0.2%
1890	586	−9.3%
1900	554	−5.5%
1910	554	+0.0%
1923	586	+5.8%
1934	554	−5.5%
1939	540	−2.5%

Year	Pop.	±%
1951	660	+22.2%
1961	601	−8.9%
1971	587	−2.3%
1981	608	+3.6%
1991	729	+19.9%
2001	734	+0.7%
2011	673	−8.3%
