= Zwischenwasser =

- Municipality
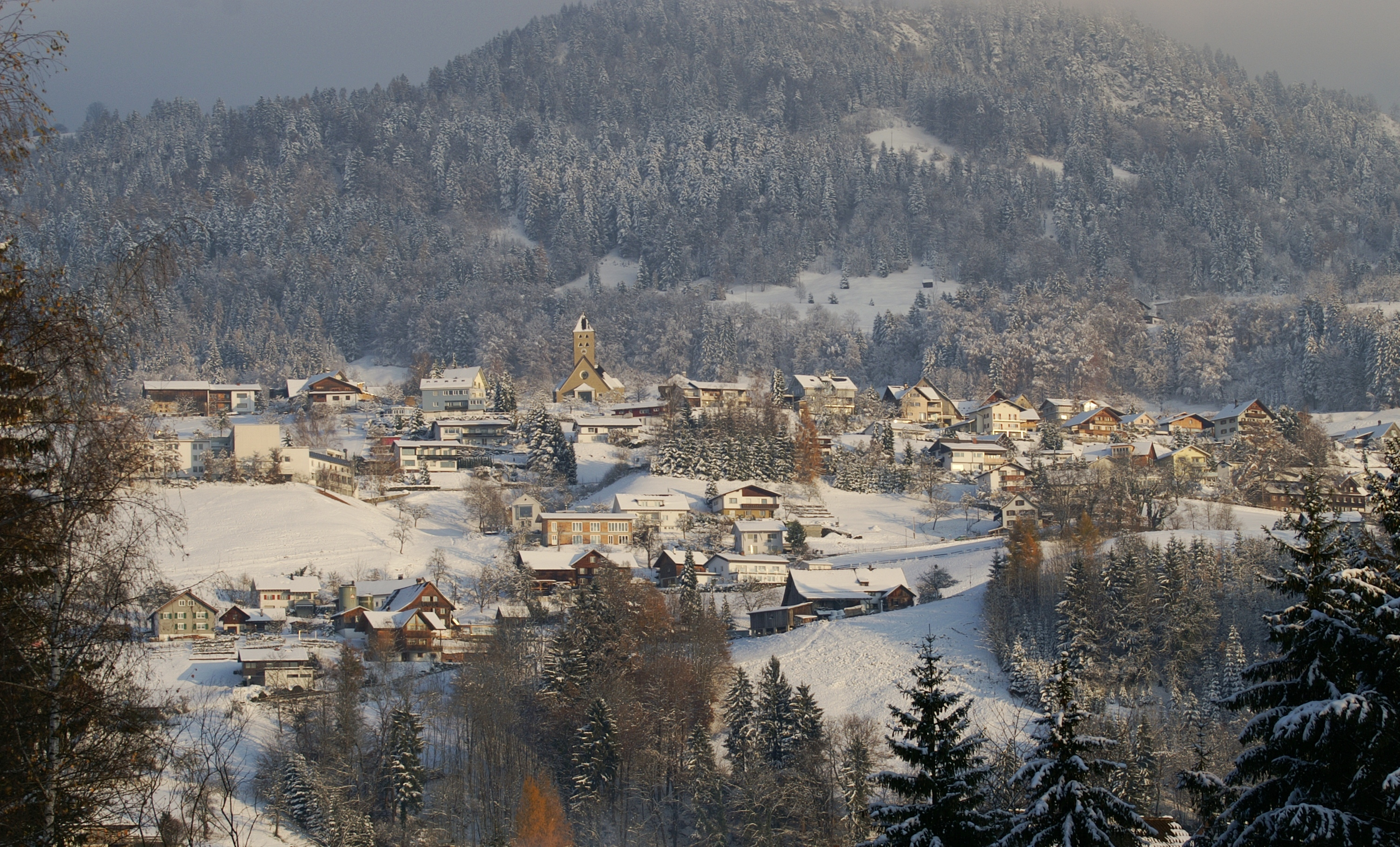

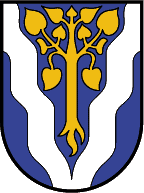
- Coat of arms

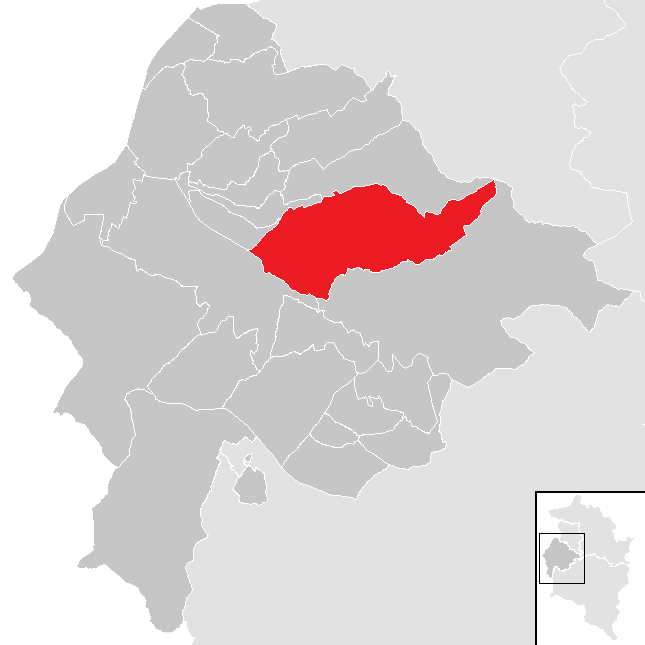
- Location within Feldkirch district

- Location within Austria
- Coordinates: 47°16′N 09°39′E
- Country: Austria
- State: Vorarlberg
- District: Feldkirch

Government
  - Mayor: Jürgen Bachmann

Area
  - Total: 22.63 km^{2} (8.74 sq mi)
- Elevation: 525 m (1,722 ft)

Population (2018-01-01)
  - Total: 3,203
  - Density: 141.5/km^{2} (366.6/sq mi)
- Time zone: UTC+1 (CET)
  - Summer (DST): UTC+2 (CEST)
- Postal code: 6835
- Website: http://www.zwischenwasser.at

Zwischenwasser is a municipality in the district of Feldkirch in the Austrian state of Vorarlberg.

Zwischenwasser consists of three localities (Ortschaften): (Population as of 2025)

- Batschuns (1,250)
- Dafins (470)
- Muntlix (1,699)

== Demographics ==
Historical population
| Year | Pop. | ±% |
|---|---|---|
| 1869 | 854 | — |
| 1880 | 920 | +7.7% |
| 1890 | 939 | +2.1% |
| 1900 | 983 | +4.7% |
| 1910 | 984 | +0.1% |
| 1923 | 971 | −1.3% |
| 1934 | 1,135 | +16.9% |
| 1939 | 1,109 | −2.3% |
| 1951 | 1,363 | +22.9% |
| 1961 | 1,671 | +22.6% |
| 1971 | 2,329 | +39.4% |
| 1981 | 2,552 | +9.6% |
| 1991 | 2,813 | +10.2% |
| 2001 | 3,050 | +8.4% |
| 2011 | 3,140 | +3.0% |
| 2021 | 3,351 | +6.7% |
| 2026 | 3,416 | +1.9% |

== Politics ==
The municipal council (Gemeinderat) consists of 24 members. Since the 2025 local elections, it is made up of the following parties:

- We Engage Zwischenwasser (Z3): 19 seats
- The Greens - The Green Alternative (GRÜNE): 5 seats

The mayor, Jürgen Bachmann (Independent), was re-elected in 2025.
