= Kanisfluh =

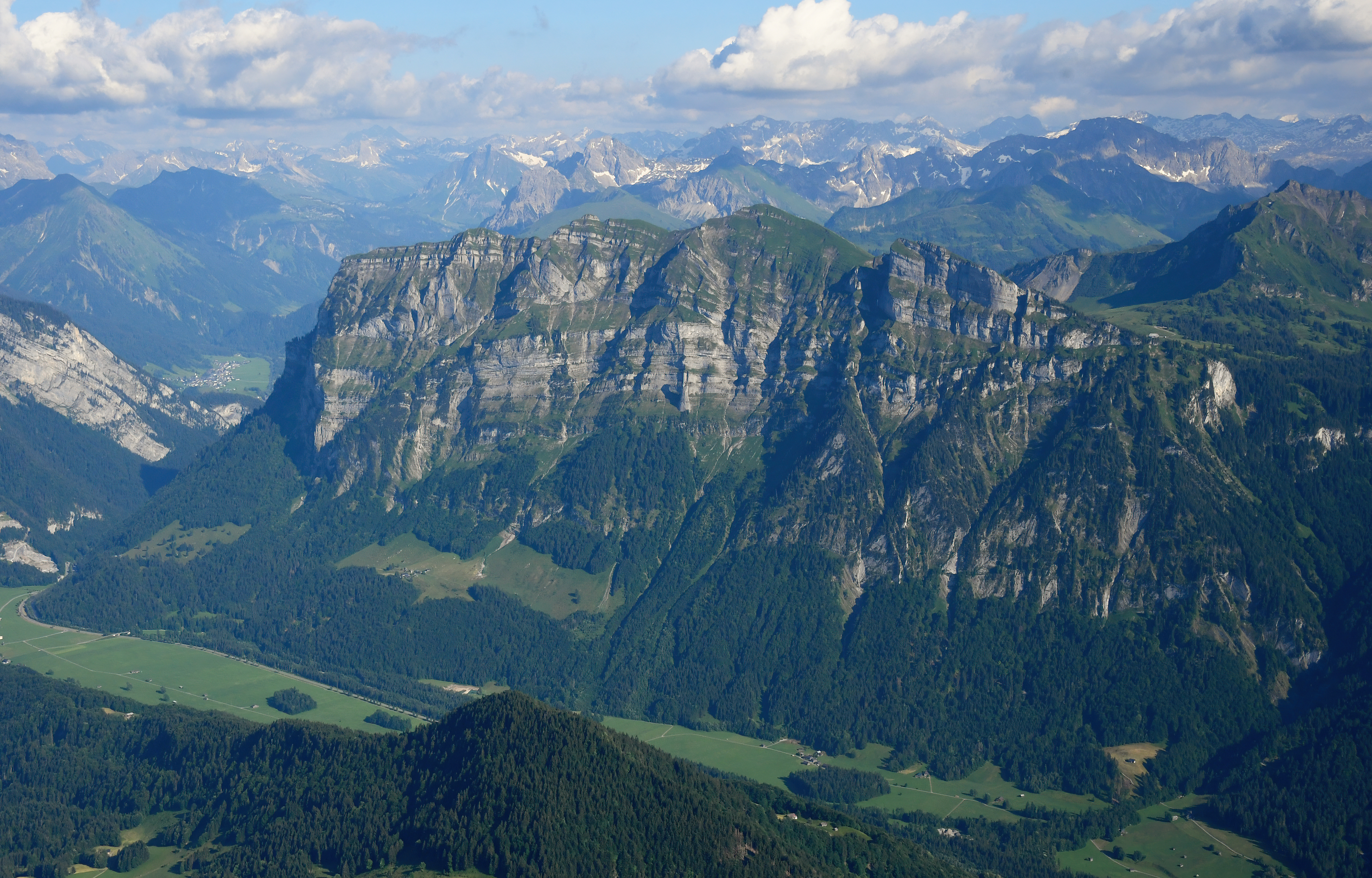
- Kanisfluh north face

Highest point
- Elevation: 2,044 m (6,706 ft)AA
- Coordinates: 47°19′54″N 09°55′37″E

Geography
- Location within Alps
- Location: Vorarlberg, Austria
- Parent range: Bregenz Forest

The Kanisfluh is a mostly isolated massif in the central Bregenz Forest Mountains between the municipalities Mellau, Au and Schnepfau.The Kanisfluh is considered the most famous mountain and landmark of the Bregenz Forest, Vorarlberg, Austria.

== Location and peaks ==
Viewed from the North, the prominent cliff face of the Kanisfluh dominates the valley of Schnepfau and Bregenzer Ach, while the grassy south slopes decline more gently.

The highest peak is the "Holenke" at an elevation of 2,044 metres AA (6,706 feet), which can be climbed via a comfortable mountain trail (SAC hiking scale T2). Other peaks are the "Hoher Stoß" (1,806 m AA), the "Runder Kopf" (2,014 m AA) and the "Sonnenspitze" (1,965 m AA). No trails lead to these, reaching them occasionally requires advanced mountaineering abilities.

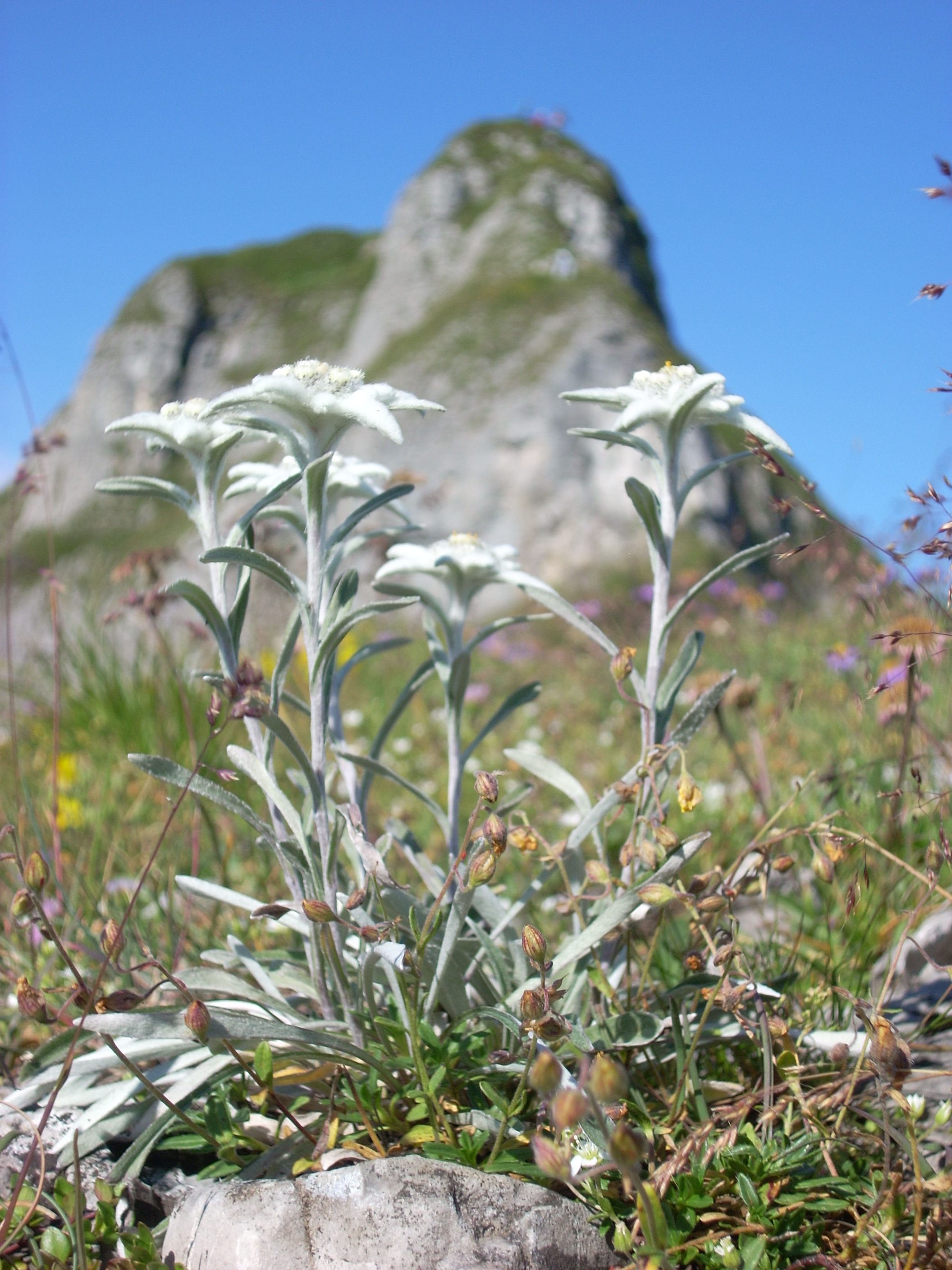
Edelweiss on the Kanisfluh, Holenke in the background

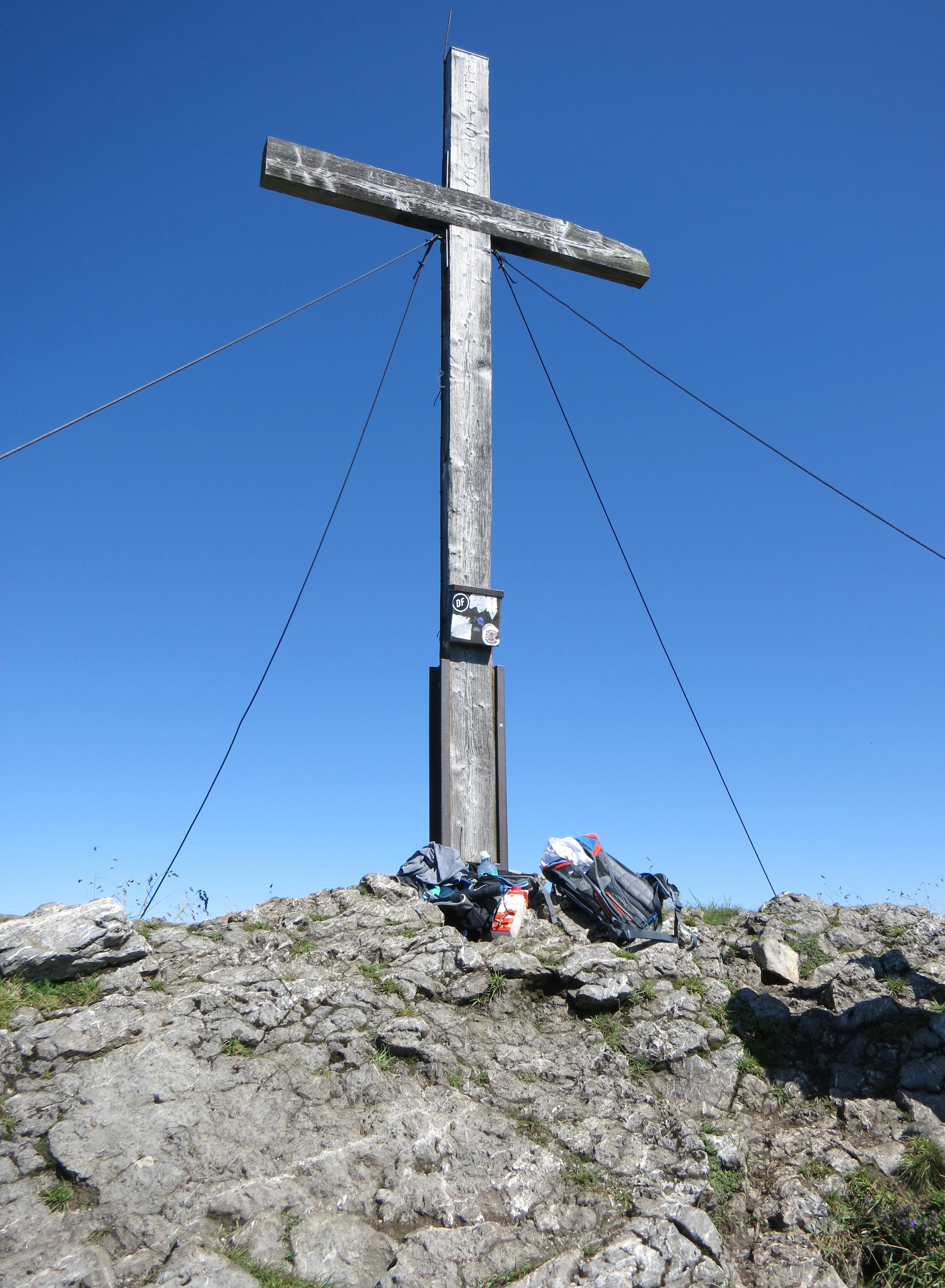
The summit cross

== Delineation and neighboring mountain groups ==
In the current Alpine Club Guide by Dieter Seibert (2008) as well as the preceding version by Walther Flaig (1977), there Damülser Berge und Kanisfluh, and also in the SOIUSA classification by Marizzi (there sub-group b) the Kanisfluh is assigned to the group of the Damülser Berge (Damülsian mountains), because they form a common ridge.
The Gebirgsgruppengliederung für das österreichische Höhlenverzeichnis (mountain group classification for the Austrian cave index) by Trimmel has the Kanisfluh as a completely independent group due to its geological discreteness (no. 1117). It is delineated by:

- in the North and East Bregenzer Ach up to Au towards the Östliches Bregenzerwaldgebirge (Hirschberg range and Mittagsfluh massif)
- in the South Argenbach to Argenzipfel towards Zitterklapfen group of the Lechquellen Mountains
- in the West Argenzipfel ditch (Leuebach) and trail to the Obere Alp (Oberälple) – saddle (height ca. 1635 m) of the connecting range to Klippern – trail to Wurzachalpe – trail and ditch to Hofstetten inn – Bregenzer Ach near Mellau, towards Mittagsspitzgruppe, the Damülser Berge in the narrow sense

== Geology ==
The Kanisfluh is a typical limestone massif, though is not part of the thrust sheet system of the Northern Limestone Alps, but is rather formed from the Jurassic limestone of the Helveticum, which is more closely related to the Franco-Swiss Jura Mountains than to the Wetterstein or Dachstein Formation limestone of the eastern alps.

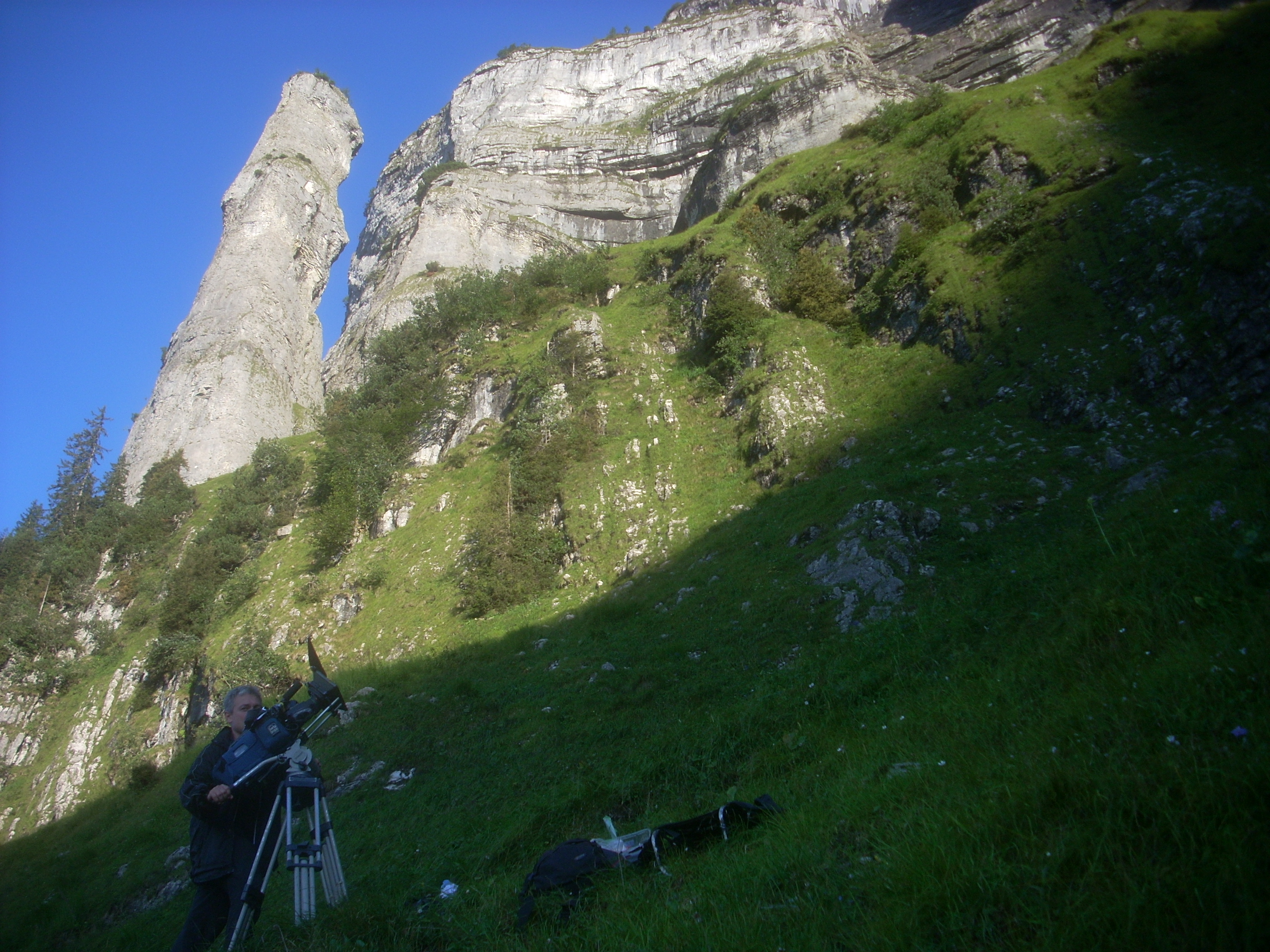
Wirmsäule (Wirm column) at the north cliff of the Kanisfluh

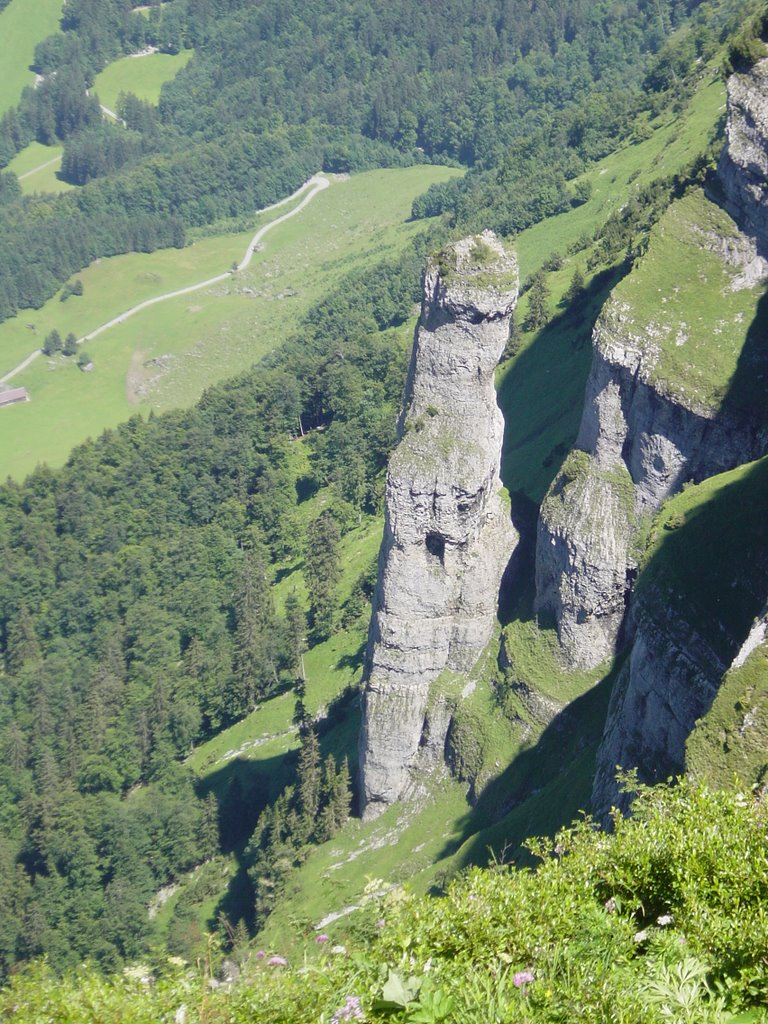
Wirmsäule seen from Häle

== Culture ==
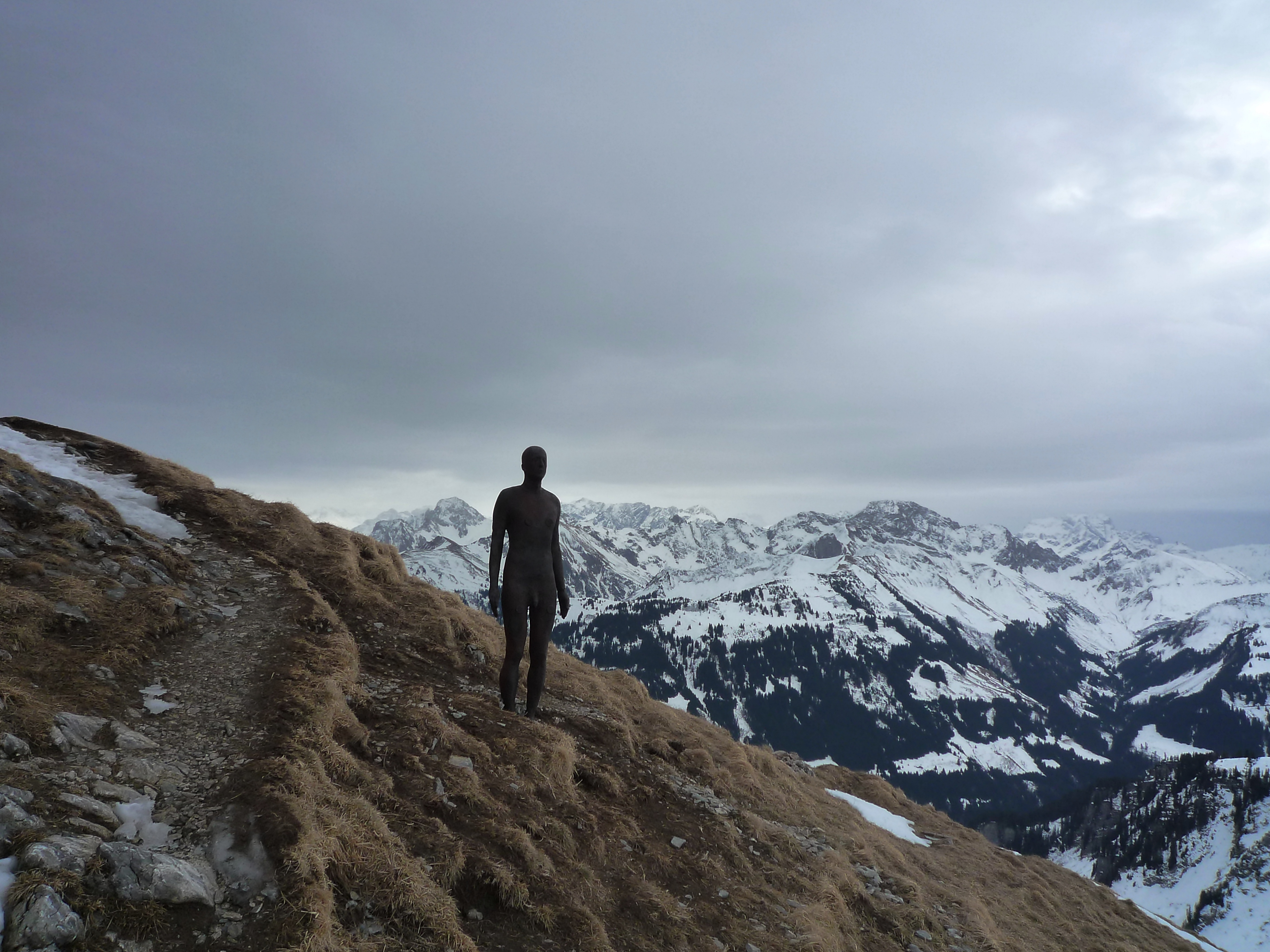
Statue of the Horizon Field Project

From 2010 to 2012 a statue of the Horizon Field project by Antony Gormley stood slightly below the summit of the Holenke.

=== Origin of name ===
In 1340 the designation "Kalendis" is used in a document, a name known from Grisons. The name "Fluh" is the Allemannic word for "cliff" and refers to the steep rock face on the North side.

In contrast, a legend talks about an immigrant called Canisio from the Swiss canton Valais around the time of 1400. Before he could fetch his bride from his old homeland, she had died there and in sad remembrance he brought several plants of Edelweiss from her grave and planted them on the slopes of the Holenke. Kanisfluh is supposedly derived from the name Canisio.

== Gravel mining ==
The Rüf company has plans to mine gravel at the foot of the Kanisfluh. Gravel mining does not present a problem for state geologist Eva Vigl, as one would only scratch the surface and the Kansisfluh would not become destabilized. The municipality of Schnepfau, however, wants to prevent the mining of 800,000 m³ of stone over the next 30 years. The state authority is reviewing if Schnepfau may put the area under nature preservation. In the discussion about the gravel mining at the foot of the Kanisfluh, the Greens argue for putting the Kanisfluh under large-scale nature preservation.

An intervention like the gravel mining would be a permanent wound in the natural scenery and is therefore impermissible. In addition, the Kanisfluh is the asset for the tourism in the Bregenz Forest.

— Green economic spokesperson Sandra Schoch,

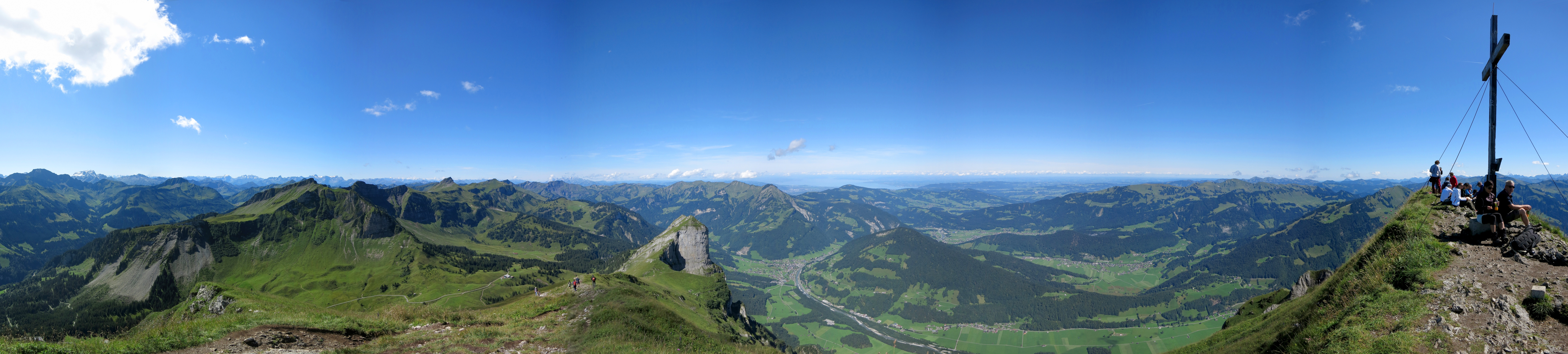
Panorama from the Kanisfluh
