= Bregenz Forest Mountains =

Mountain range in Vorarlberg, Austria

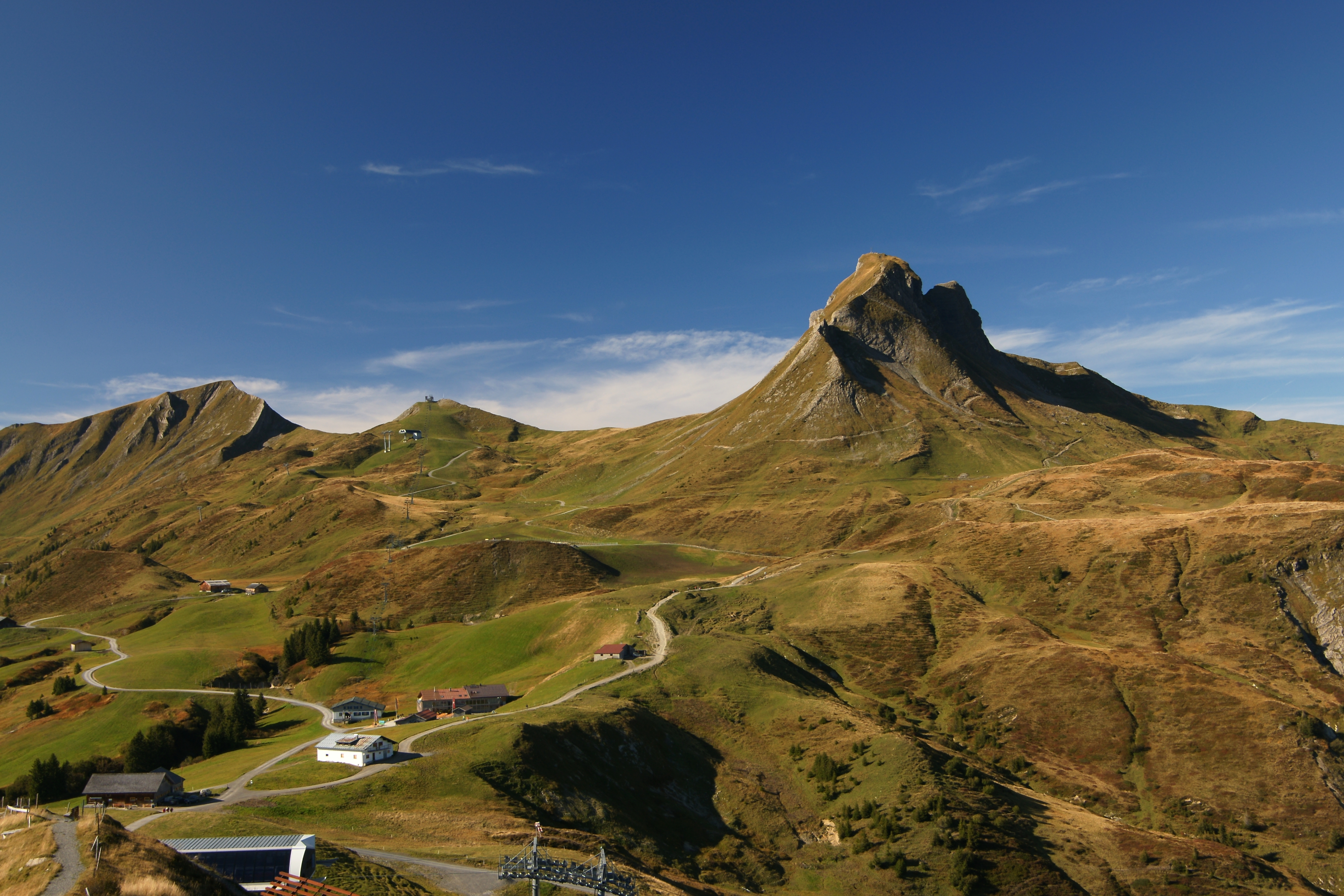
- Damülser Mittagsspitze, 2,095 m (6,873 ft)

Highest point
- Peak: Glatthorn
- Elevation: 2,134 m (7,001 ft)

Geography
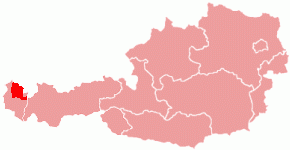
- Bregenzerwald region within Austria
- Country: Austria
- State: Vorarlberg
- Range coordinates: 47°15′55″N 9°52′47″E
- Parent range: Northern Limestone Alps; Bavarian Alps

The Bregenz Forest Mountains, also the Bregenzerwald Mountains (German: Bregenzerwaldgebirge), are a range of the Northern Limestone Alps and Eastern Alps, named after the town of Bregenz. The Bregenz Forest Mountains are located entirely in the Austrian state of Vorarlberg.

== Definition ==
The term Bregenz Forest Mountains refers to the range according to the Alpine Club classification of the Eastern Alps (AVE); the term Bregenz Forest, by contrast, refers to a landscape or region which is part of the Bregenzer Ache basin area. As a result, the Bregenz Forest Mountains and the Bregenz Forest are not conterminous.

The Bregenz Forest region also includes the southwestern parts of the Allgäu Alps. On the other hand, the Bregenz Forest Mountains reach, to an extent, into the landscapes of the eastern Rhine Valley, as well as to the Walgau Valley of the Ill River and the Großes Walsertal in the south.

As the range is not geologically uniform, the name is rarely used outside of Alpine literature, is also not used in Vorarlberg state geography and land-use planning and belongs to one of the most disputed mountain groups in the AVE. According to an alternative orographically and hydrologically-oriented mountain range classification (Hubert Trimmel, 1962), the mountains belong to a Rhine Valley–Walgau–Bregenz Forest group.

== Geography ==
The mountain range is part of a landscape arranged in several tiers rising from the Rhine Valley in the west up to the adjacent Lechquellen Mountains. Most of the area is shaped by a Mittelgebirge character with extended forests and Alpine pastures, except for small High Alpine region in the southeast.

The Bregenzerwald mountain range is located in the far northwest of the Eastern Alps, east of the lower Alpine Rhine Valley and southeast of Lake Constance. It lies entirely within the Austrian state of Vorarlberg and dominates its northern half.

The perimeter of the Bregenzerwald mountains runs clockwise along the line Lake Constance - Bregenzer Ach - Subersach - Schönenbach - Osterguntenbach - Stogger Sattel - Rehmerbach - Bregenzer Ach - Argenbach - Brägazbach - Faschinajoch - Faschinabach - Seebergbach - Lutz - Ill - Rhine - Lake Constance.

The Faschinajoch connects the Bregenzerwald mountains with the Lechquellengebirge. The Stogger Sattel provides the connection to the Allgäu Alps.

=== Neighbouring ranges ===
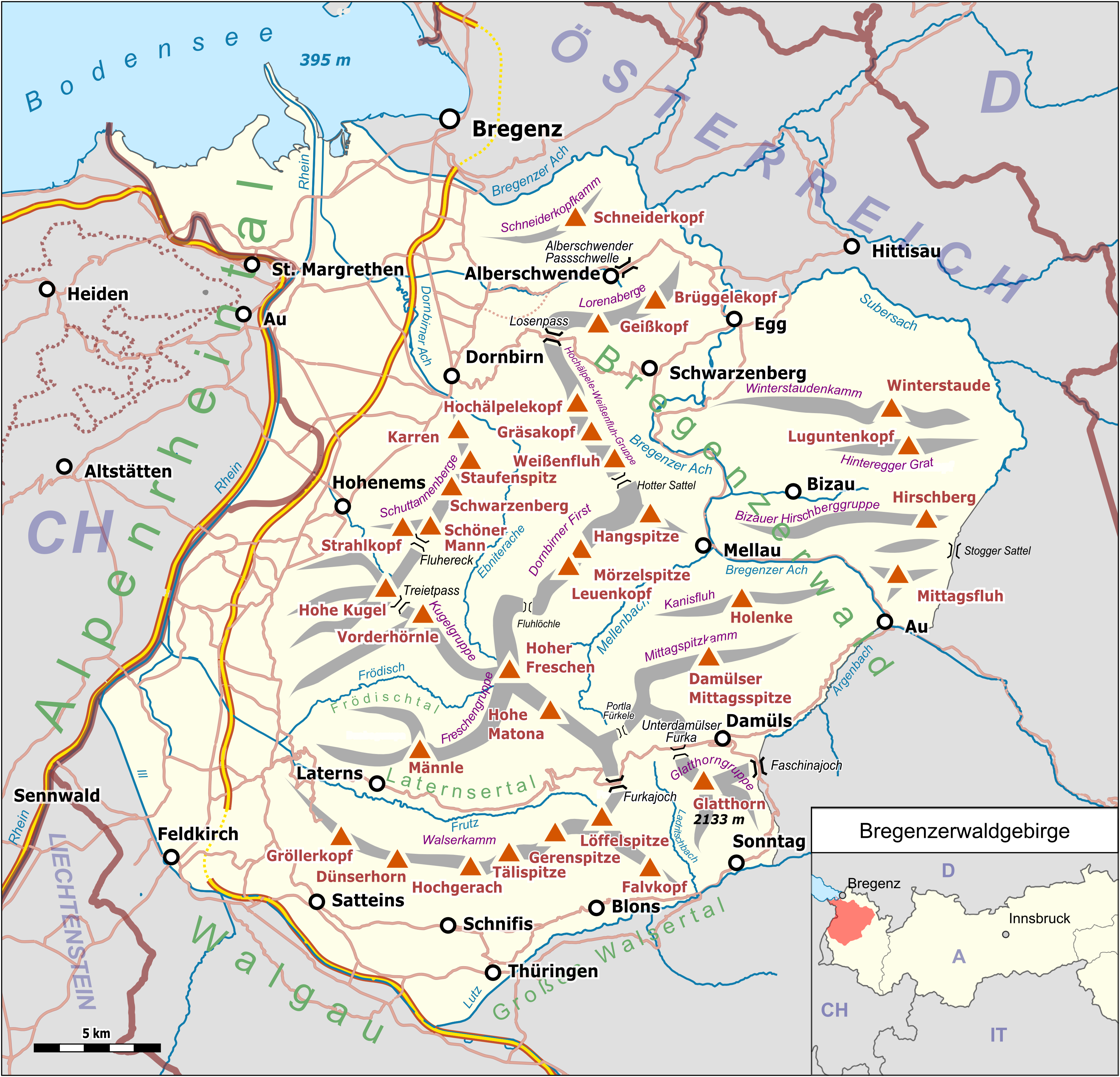
Map of the Bregenz Forest Mountains

The Bregenz Forest Mountains are bordered by the following other Alpine ranges:

- Allgäu Alps (to the north and east)
- Lechquellen Mountains (to the south)
- Rätikon (to the southwest)
- Appenzell Alps (to the west)

=== Peaks ===
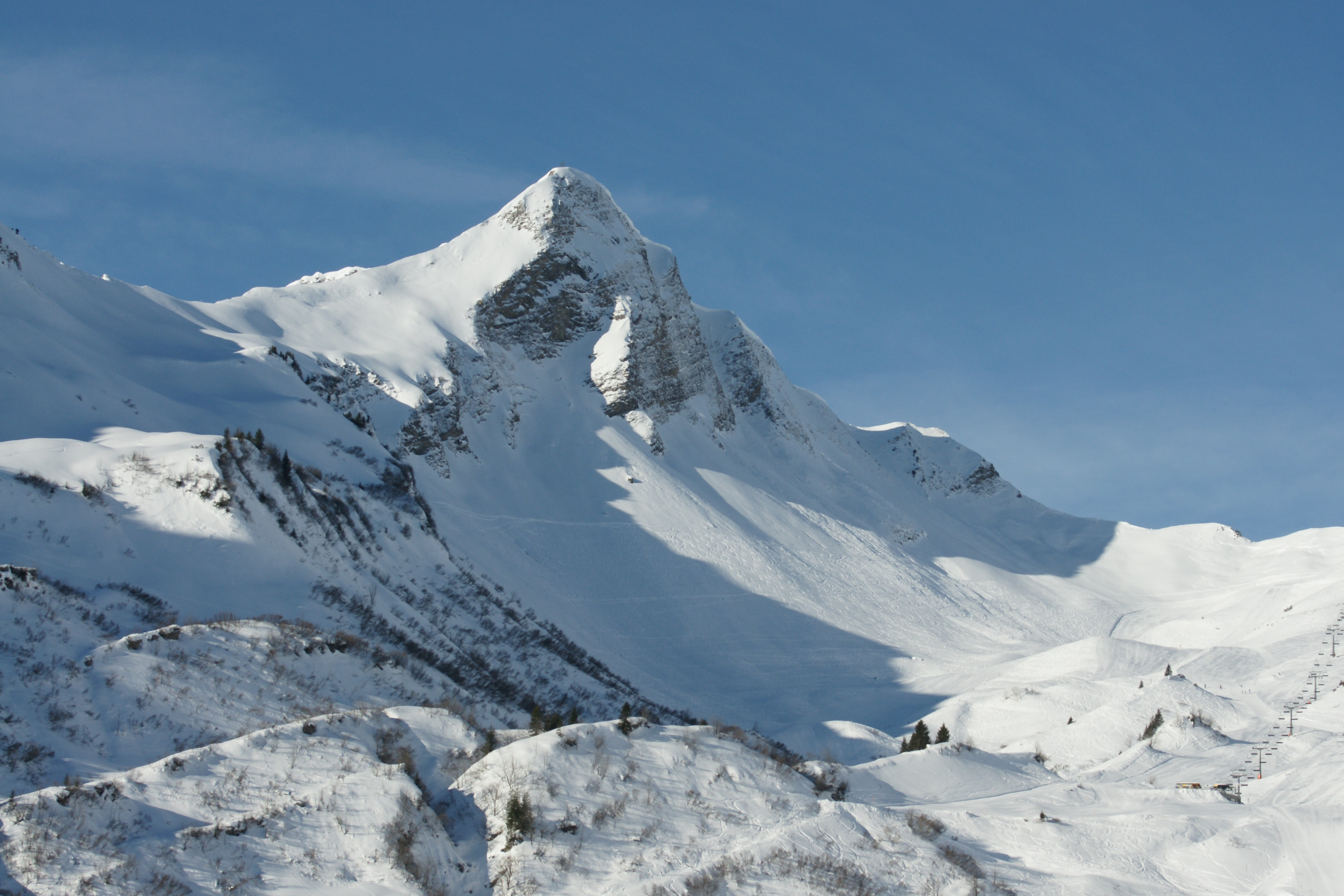
Glatthorn (2,134 m)

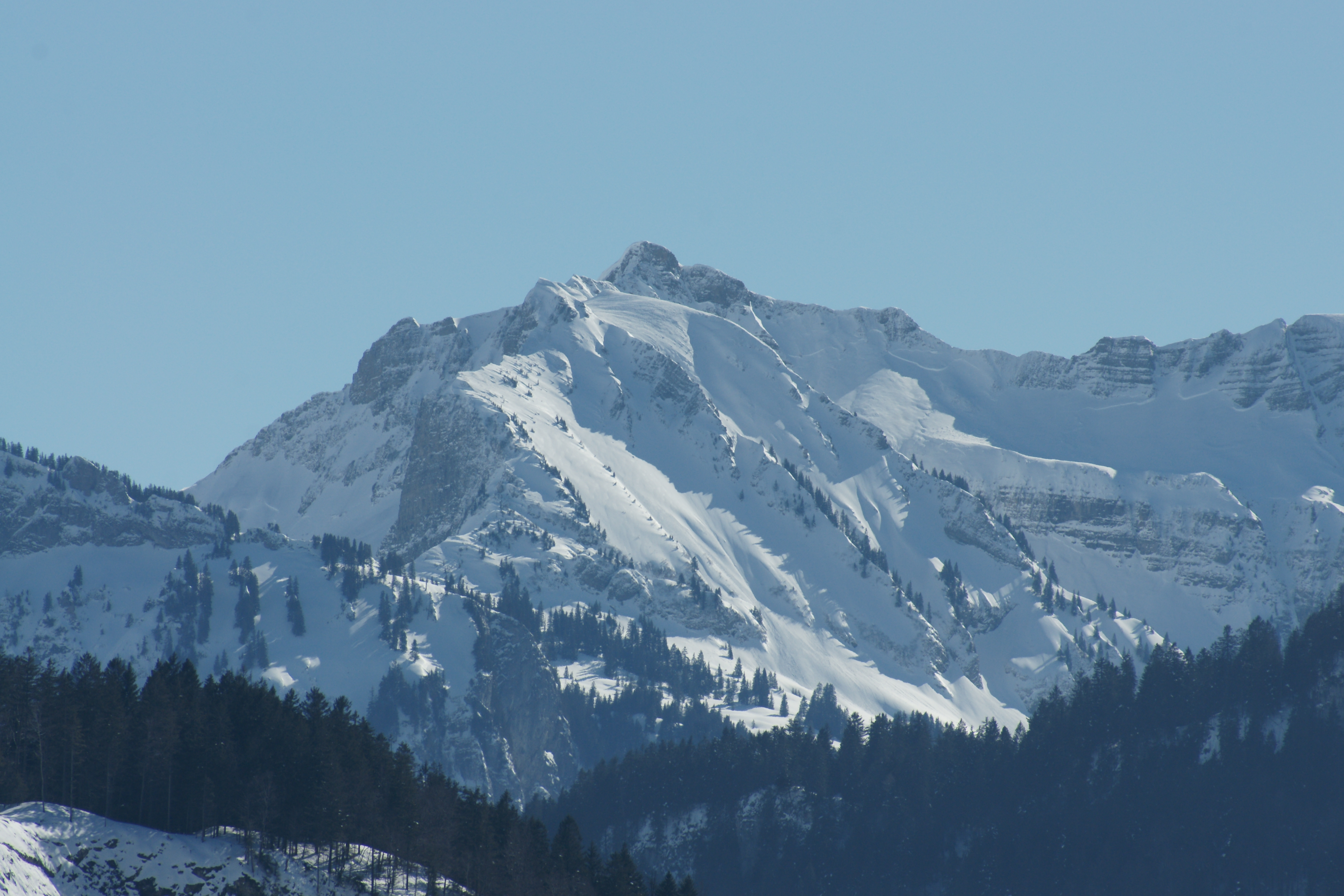
Klippern (2,066 m)

The main peaks of the Bregenz Forest Mountains include the following: see Coordinates Bregenz Forest Mountains

- Glatthorn, 2,134 m
- Damülser Mittagsspitze, 2,095 m
- Diedamskopf 2,090 m
- Türtschhorn, 2,096 m
- Hochblanken, 2,068 m
- Klippern, 2,066 m
- Sünser Spitze, 2,062 m
- Gungern, 2,053 m
- Ragazer Blanken, 2,051 m
- Kanisfluh, main summit, 2,044 m
- Hübscher Bühel, 2,032 m

Other important and well-known peaks in the Bregenz Forest Mountains (in order of decreasing height):

- Hohes Licht 2,009 m
- Hoher Freschen 2,004 m
- Hochrohkopf 1,975 m
- Winterstaude 1,877 m
- Hirschberg (Bizau) 1,834 m
- Mörzelspitze, 1,830 m
- Leuenkopf, 1,830 m
- Hangspitze 1,746 m
- Niedere 1,711 m
- Hohe Kugel 1,645 m
- Baumgartenalpe 1,624 m
- Hochälpelekopf, 1,467 m
- Staufen 1,456 m
- Renkknie 1,411 m
- Brüggelekopf 1,182 m
- Hirschberg (Langen) 1,095 m
- Karren 971 m

== Geology ==
Due to its location on the border between the Eastern Alps and the Western Alps, the Bregenz Forest mountains geologically extremely diverse.

The largest part of it can be attributed to the Helvetic, which was formed in the Cretaceous and Paleogene periods. During this period, the Penninic Ocean lay where the Alps are today, and thick limestone deposits formed on its northern edge, the Helvetic Shelf, over the course of millions of years. During the later formation of the Alps, these deposits - which had now become limestone - were pushed northwards and folded several times. The hard siliceous limestone and Schrattenkalk rocks form the rock faces typical of the Bregenzerwald mountains, which are particularly evident in the Schuttannenberge, the Freschengruppe or the northern cliffs of the Damülser Berge, but also in the Winterstaudenkamm. On the other hand, there are the softer, marly Drusberg layers, which weather easily and thus provide a favorable breeding ground for forests and alpine pastures, as can be seen particularly impressively on the Hoher Freschen. Kanisfluh and Mittagsfluh stand out in the middle of this area, consisting of Jurassic limestone and thus the oldest rocks in the Bregenzerwald mountains.

To the north and south of the Helvetic zone are two geological sections known as the flysch zone. During the Upper Cretaceous, large quantities of sand were washed from the Central Alps, which were still below sea level at the time, into a deep-sea channel of the Pennine Ocean. This solidified into sandstone under the pressure prevailing at depth and was later pushed over the Helvetic rocks when the Alps were folded up. Today, large parts of this layer have already been eroded away. It is still present as a northern flysch zone in a narrow strip north of the line Dornbirn - Gütle - Andelsbuch - Sibratsgfäll, i.e. mainly in the Hochälpele-Weißenfluh group, and also as a southern flysch zone south of the line Feldkirch - Satteins - Innerlaterns - Damülser Mittagsspitze - Schoppernau, particularly in the eastern Walser ridge, in the southern Damüls mountains and in the Glatthorn group, and beyond that in individual islands in between, most clearly recognizable in the summit of the Hohe Kugel. Even more than the Drusberg layers, the weathered surface of the sandstone and marl of this zone forms excellent soil for trees and grasses. The mountains of the flysch zone, which are all gently shaped due to the soft rock, are therefore covered with forests and meadows, even on the steepest slopes up to the summits.

The Bregenzerwald mountains north of the line Dornbirn - Egg - Hittisau, i.e. essentially the area of the Lorenaberge, consist of Subalpine Molasse, which was formed - relatively late for the Alps - in the Neogene. During this geological phase, the European plate was pushed downwards by the already rising Alps, so that a sea sink, known as the Paratethys, formed between the newly forming mountains and the continental plate. Rivers transported erosion material from the young Alps into this arm of the sea, where it was then deposited as sediment. In the later course of mountain formation, these rocks were also folded up. Nagelfluh is typical of this zone, but sandstone and marl also occur.

== Landscape ==
Almost the entire western Bregenzerwald mountains consist of a single, star-shaped, branching mountain range. Starting from the Hoher Freschen, the mountain ranges run east (Damülser Berge), south (Walserkamm), southwest (Alpwegkopf), northwest (Kugel-Schuttannen chain) and north (First-Hochälpele-Gaißkopf chain). Only the Glatthorn group forms a comparatively clearly defined mountain range, which is separated from the Damüls mountains by the deep-cutting Unterdamüls Furka. From the Rhine Valley, the Schwarzach, the Dornbirner Ach (Ebniter Tal), the Frödisch and the Frutz (Laternsertal) cut striking valleys between the chains, from the Bregenzerwald it is mainly the Mellenbach and from the Großes Walsertal the Ladritschbach. With the Staufensee and the Sünser See there are also two larger mountain lakes in this area.

With the Mittagsfluh, the Bizauer Hirschberggruppe, the Hinteregger Grat and the Winterstaudenkamm, the eastern Bregenzerwaldgebirge consists of four mountain ranges of different lengths running parallel from west to east, separated from each other by the Weißenbach, the Bizauer Bach and the Grebenbach, all of which flow westwards into the Bregenzer Ach.

The summit heights throughout the Bregenzerwald mountains rise from northwest to southeast. The mountains are dominated by low mountain ranges covered with meadows and forests, with high mountains only to be found at the extreme southern edge at the transition to the Lechquellen Mountains.

== Nature conservancy ==
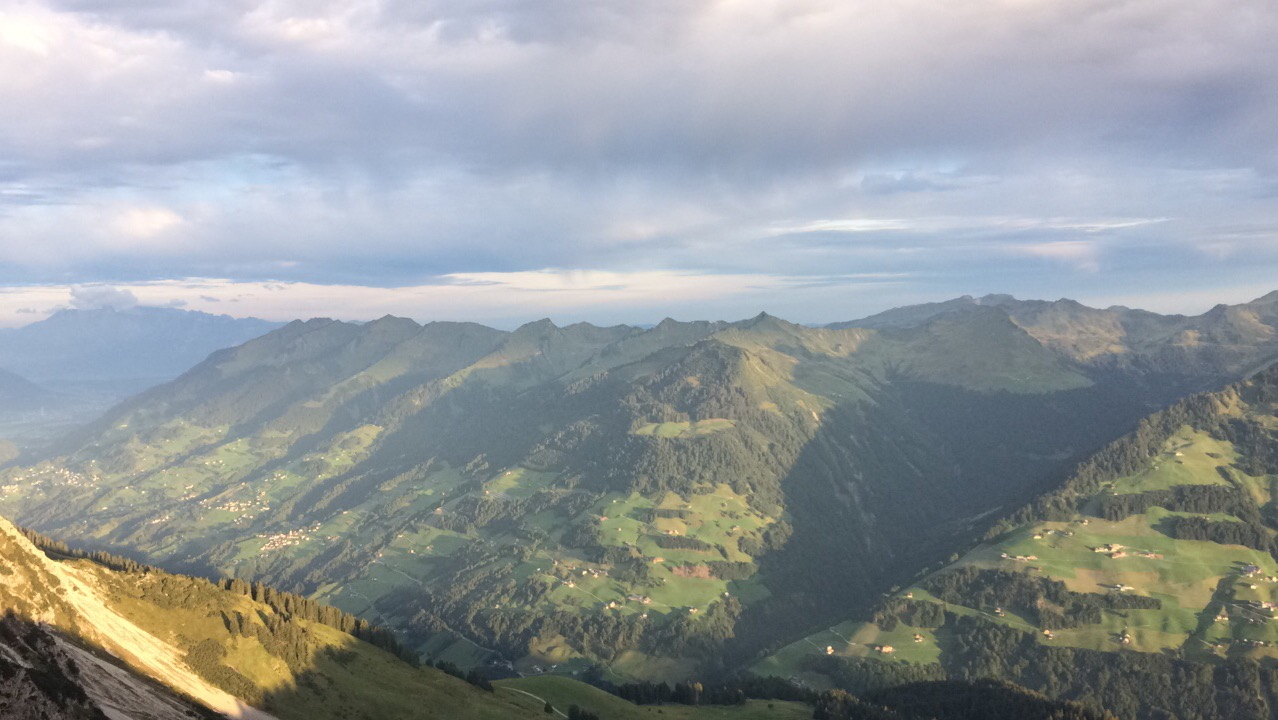
View of the Biosphere Park Großes Walsertal from Alpe Steris

Due to the remoteness of some areas, there are many nature reserves that can be found in the Bregenz Forest Mountains.

- Part of the Walserkamm and the whole Glatthorn group lie in the area of the 19,200-hectare UNESCO Biosphere Reserve Großes Walsertal.
- A total of nine Natura 2000 sites are located in the Bregenzerwald mountains with the Bregenzerach-Gorge, the Fohramoos, the Unter Stellerhöhe area, the Unter der Winterstaude area, the Unterragenstein, the Üble Schlucht (Gorge) and the Übersaxen-Satteins, Walsbächle and Torfriedbach areas.
- The largest nature reserve area according to Vorarlberg national law, Hohe-Kugel – Hoher Freschen – Mellental, lies in the Bregenzerwald mountains, as well as the smaller nature reserves Farnacher Moos, Fohramoos, Auer Ried, Amatlina Vita, Gasserplatz and Bludescher Magerwiesen and the protected landscapes Haslach – Breitenberg, Klien and Montiola.

== Tourism ==
=== Mountain huts ===
In the Bregenzerwald mountains there are comparatively few alpine huts with overnight accommodation. This is due to the fact that the majority of the mountain tours can be undertaken as day trips from the valleys.

Mountain huts run by the Austrian Alpine Club:

- Freschenhaus (1,846 m): open and serviced from mid-June to mid-October, 20 beds & 30 mattress storage, open but no service during winter with space for 13 camps, valley location: Laterns, walking time from Laterns: 2.5 hours.
- Hochälpelehütte (1,460 m): open and serviced from mid-May to end-October, 16 camps in a mattress storage, also open during winter in accordance with opening times of local cable cars, valley location: Schwarzenberg, walking time from Schwarzenberg: 1.75 hours
- Lustenauer Hütte (1,250 m): open and services from May to October and December – April, 13 camps in a mattress storage, valley location: Schwarzenberg or Bödele, walking time from Schwarzenberg: 2 hours and 1 hour from Bödele

There are many more huts and restaurants in this region. Therefore, it is advisable to inquire about the exact opening hours and the accessibility of the huts at the Alpenverein or in the valley resorts.

=== Long-distance routes ===
The nordalpine long distance route (DE: Nordalpine Weitwanderweg 01) and the Limestone Alps Way (DE: Kalkalpenweg) runs through the central part of the Bregenzerwald mountain range with the following sections:

- Section 17 runs from Zürs to Damüls

The greater part of this section is still in the Lechquellen Mountains. It is only at the Faschina Pass (Faschinajoch) that the Bregenzerwald Forest is entered.

- Section 18 runs from Damüls to Bregenz via Alpe Portla, Hoher Freschen, Mörzelspitze, Bödele, Dornbirn.

The Via Alpina, a cross-border hiking trail with five partial routes through the whole Alps, runs along the edge of the Bregenzerwald mountain range.

The Red Trail of the Via Alpina runs as follows with two stages through the Bregenzerwald Mountains:

- Stage R54 runs from Buchboden to St. Gerold (only the second half of this stage is in the Bregenzerwald mountains)
- Stage R55 runs from St. Gerold to Feldkirch via Röns, Schnifis and Satteins

=== Fixed-rope routes ===
Geology and geography of the Bregenzerwald Mountains are not exactly conducive to the construction of climbing routes. As easy-to-get-on routes of the simplest level can still apply:

- Binnelgrat (North Ridge) on the Hohen Freschen (2004 m)
- Valüragrat (West Ridge) on the Hohen Freschen (2004 m)
- Kugelsteig on the Hohe Kugel (1645m)
- Bocksberg-Crossing on the Bocksberg (1461 m)

== Photo gallery ==
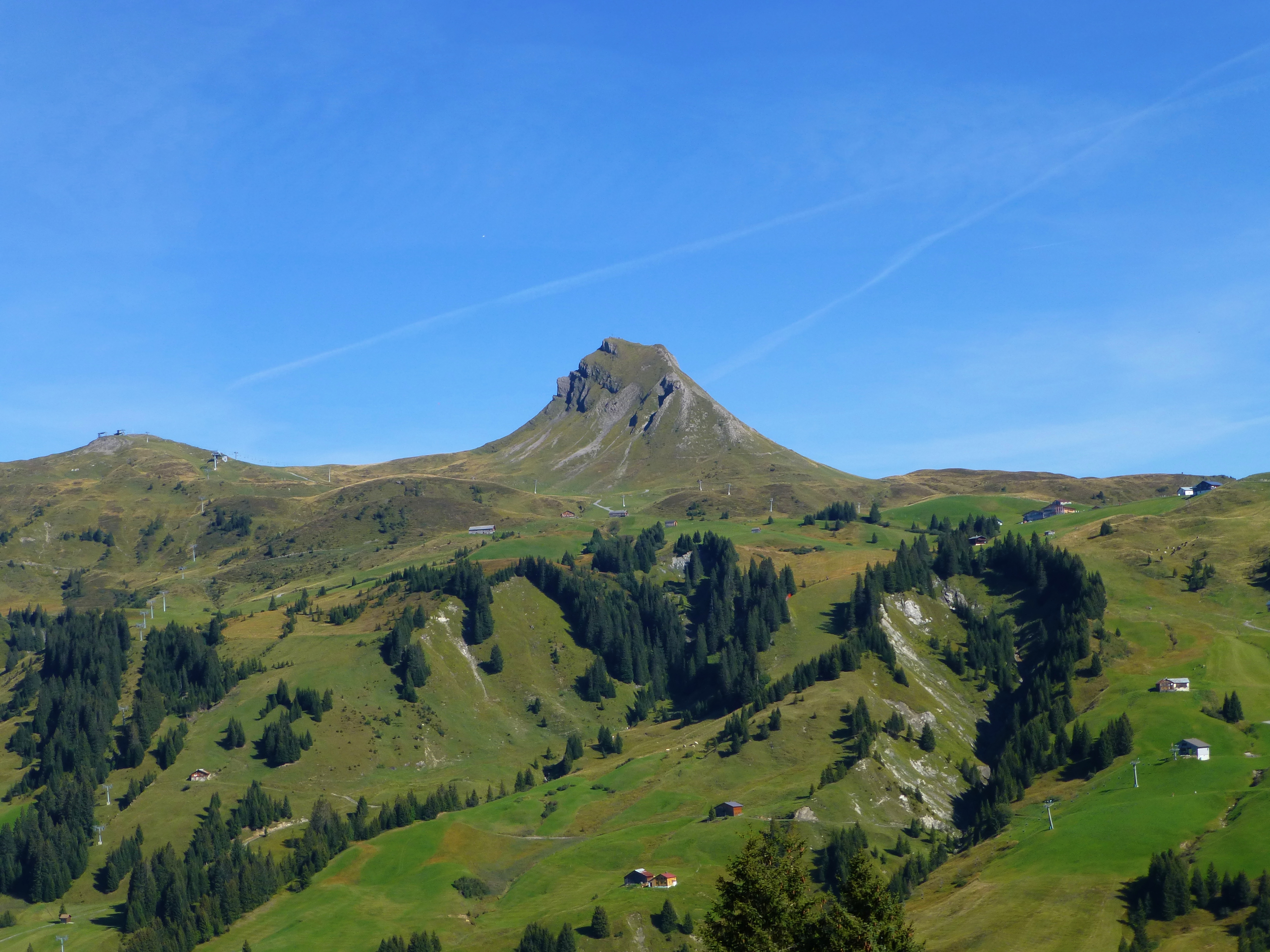
The Damülser Mittagsspitze mountain top (2,095 m)

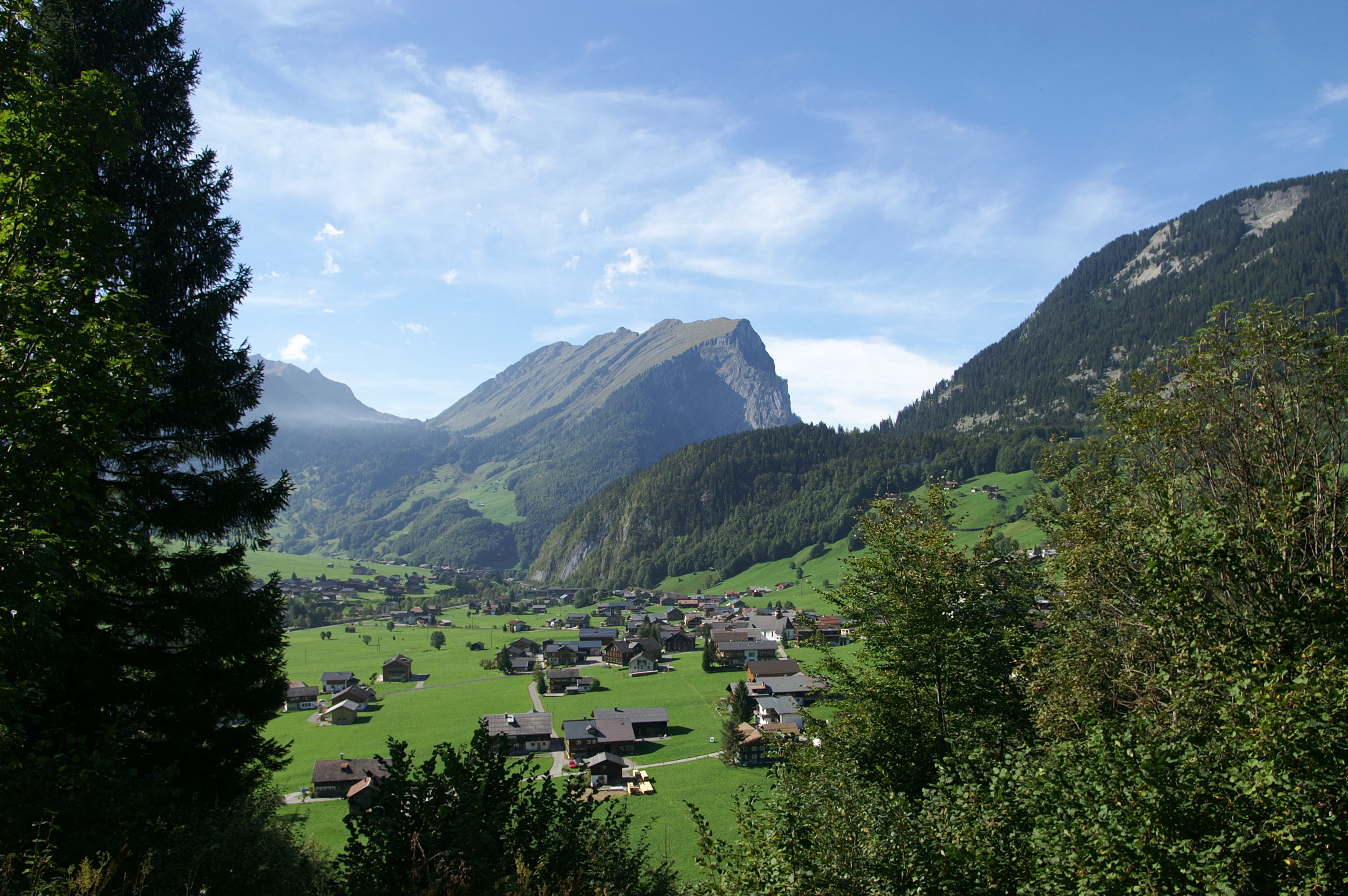
View from Holdamoos to the Kanisfluh in Au (Vorarlberg)

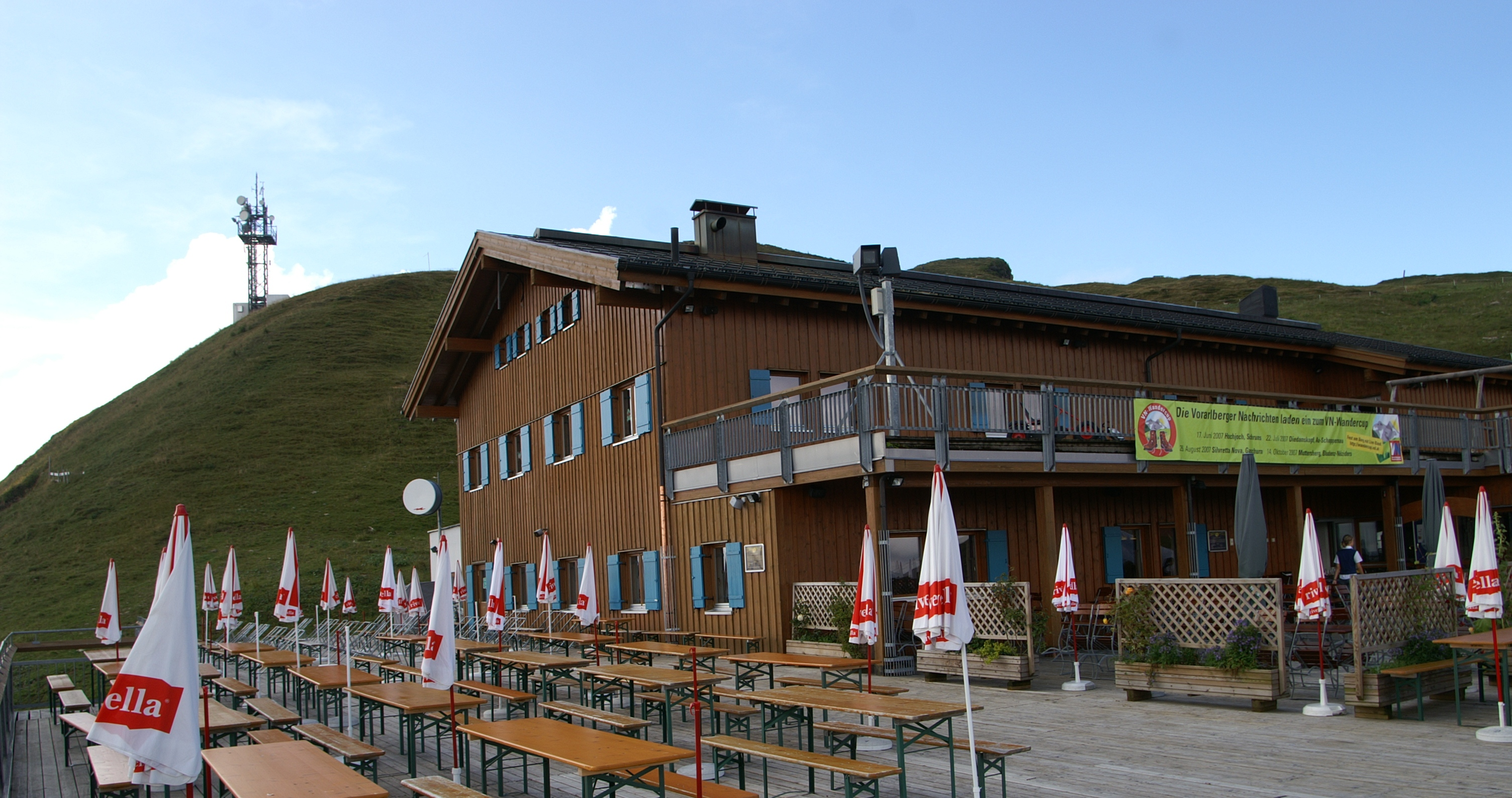
Mountain station and restaurant of the Diedamskopf mountain railways in Schoppernau in the Bregenz Forest

== Literature / maps ==
- Dieter Seibert: Alpenvereinsführer Bregenzerwald- und Lechquellengebirge alpin. Bergverlag Rother, München 2008, ISBN 978-3-7633-1095-1
- Rother Wanderführer Bregenzerwald, ISBN 3-7633-4088-2, Bergverlag Rudolf Rother, München
- Rother Wanderführer Bodensee bis Rätikon, ISBN 3-7633-4197-8, Bergverlag Rudolf Rother, München
- Rother Wanderführer Brandnertal mit Großem Walsertal und Klostertal, ISBN 3-7633-4035-1, Bergverlag Rudolf Rother, München
- Wandern kompakt Bregenzer Wald, ISBN 3-7654-3957-6, Bruckmann Verlag GmbH, München
