= Damülser Mittagsspitze =

Mountain in Vorarlberg, Austria

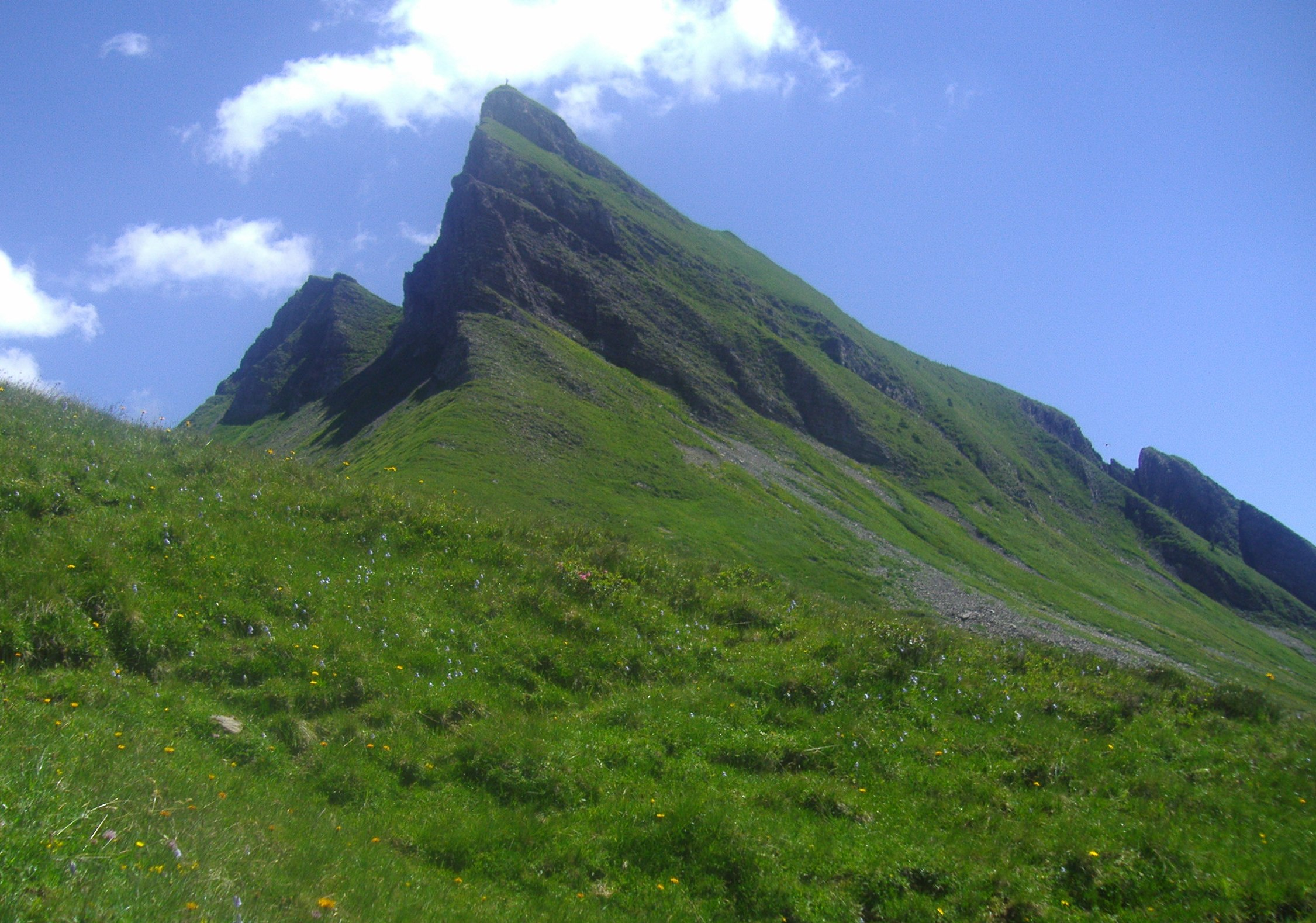
- Damülser Mittagsspitze as seen from near Hohes Licht

Highest point
- Elevation: 2,095 m (6,873 ft)
- Prominence: 609 m (1,998 ft)
- Parent peak: Glatthorn
- Isolation: 5 km (3.1 mi)
- Coordinates: 47°18′40″N 9°53′0″E

Geography
- Location within Alps
- Location: Vorarlberg, Austria
- Parent range: Bregenz Forest Mountains

Damülser Mittagsspitze is a 2,095 m (AA) high mountain in the Bregenz Forest Mountains in the Austrian state Vorarlberg.

The normal route starts from the upper station of a chairlift at 1810 m and is UIAA grade I.

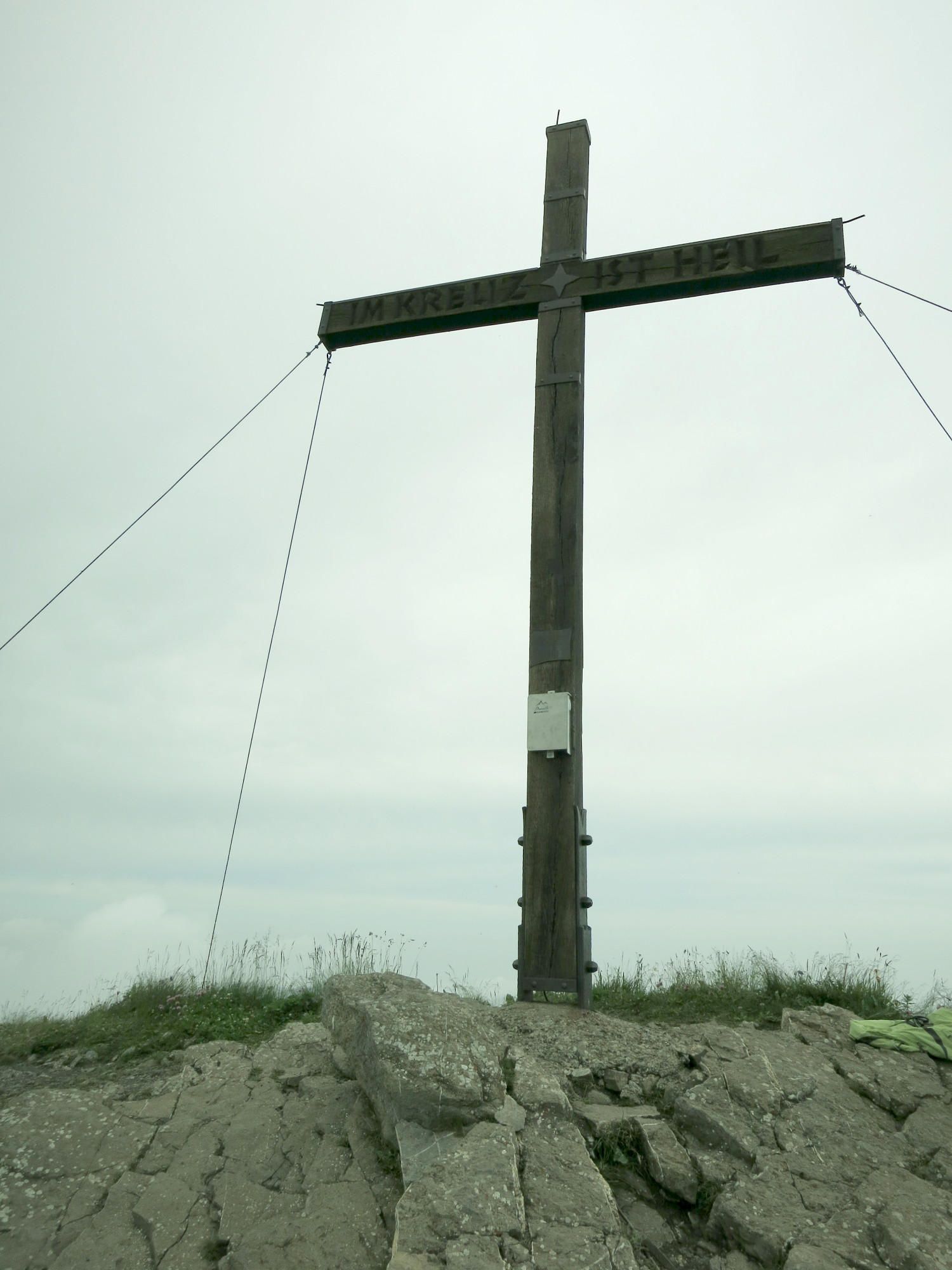
Summit cross on top of Damülser Mittagsspitze

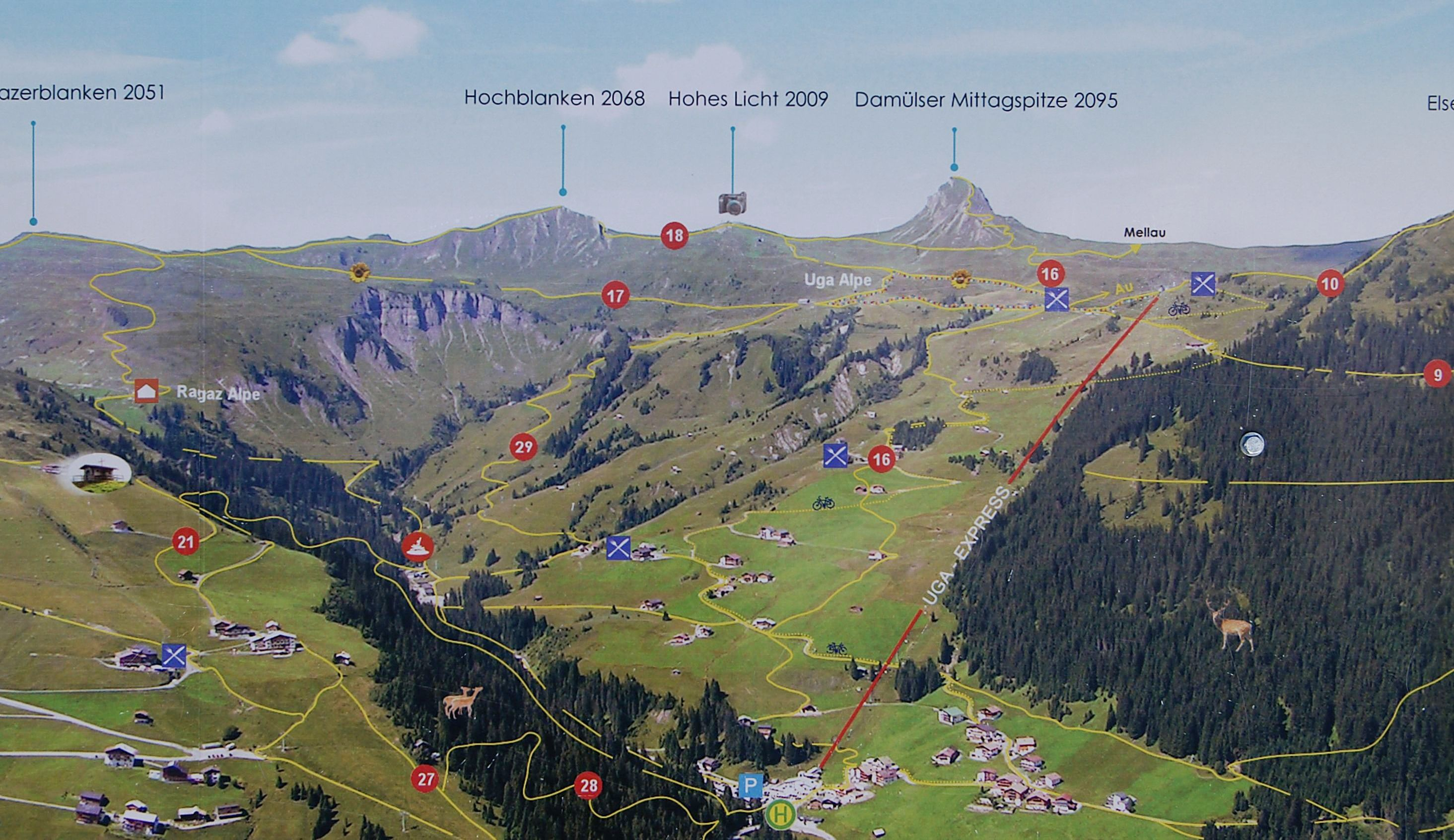
Panoramic view of the area around Damülser Mittagsspitze with hiking paths
