= Staufen =

Staufen refers to:

- Hohenstaufen, a dynasty of German emperors
- Staufen im Breisgau, a town in Baden-Württemberg, Germany
- Staufen, Aargau, in Switzerland
- Staufen (protein), a protein involved in RNA metabolism
- Staufen, Austria, a mountain in the western part of Austria
