= Horizon Field =

Sculpture by Antony Gormley

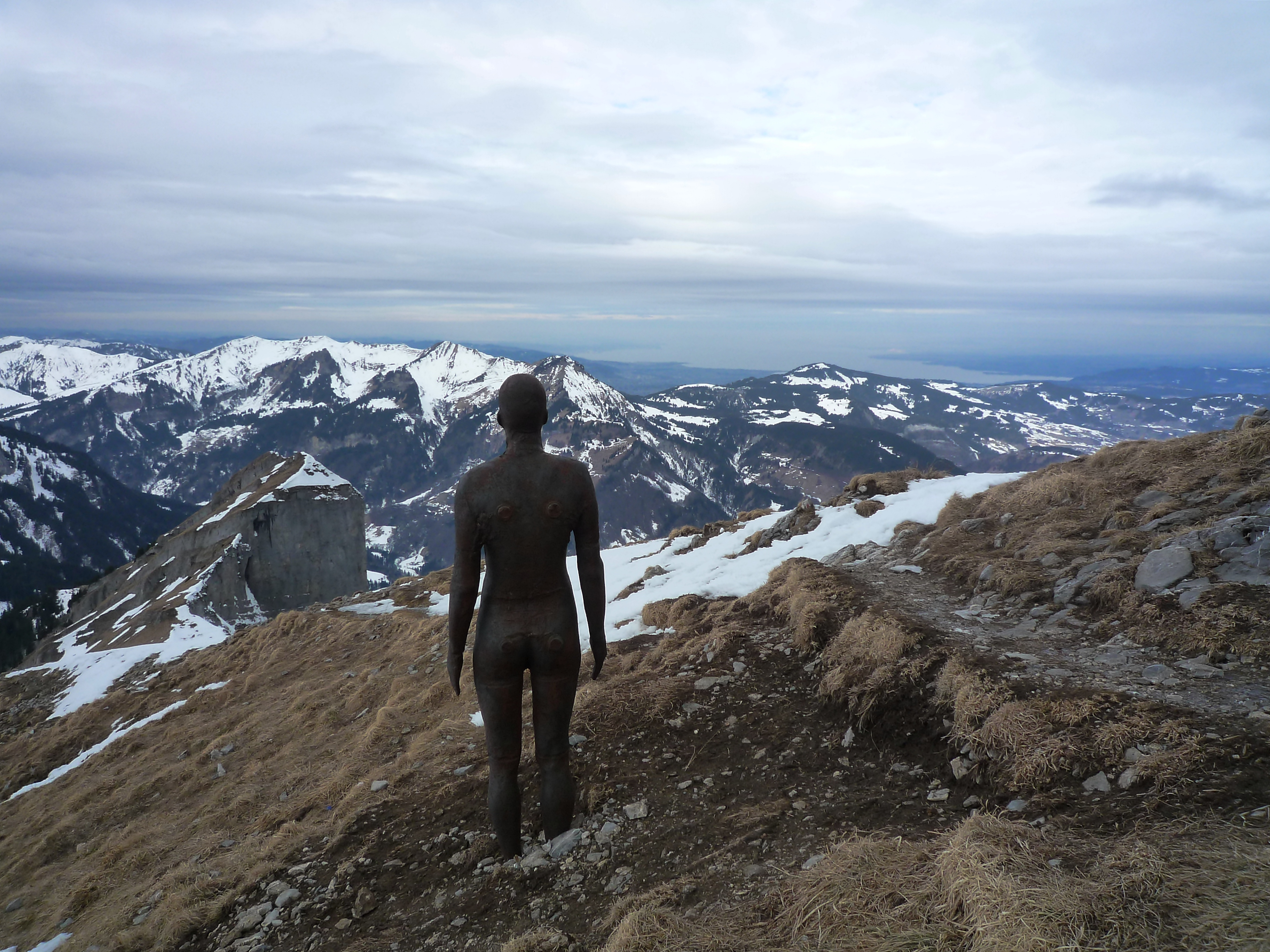
Statue-installation on the Kanisfluh (2044 m), in the background Mörzelspitze (1830 m), Hochälpelekopf (1464 m) and Lake Constance.

Horizon Field is a 2010 sculpture installation by Antony Gormley. The installation features 100 life-sized cast iron statues of the human body left at exactly 2,039 m (6,690 ft) above sea-level in the Austrian Alps. It is the first art project of its kind erected in the Alps and the largest landscape intervention in Austria to date. The work covers an area of 150 square kilometres (58 square miles) in the Land Vorarlberg, Austria, communities of Mellau, Schoppernau, Schröcken, Warth, Mittelberg, Lech, Klösterle, and Dalaas.
