= Dornbirner Ach =

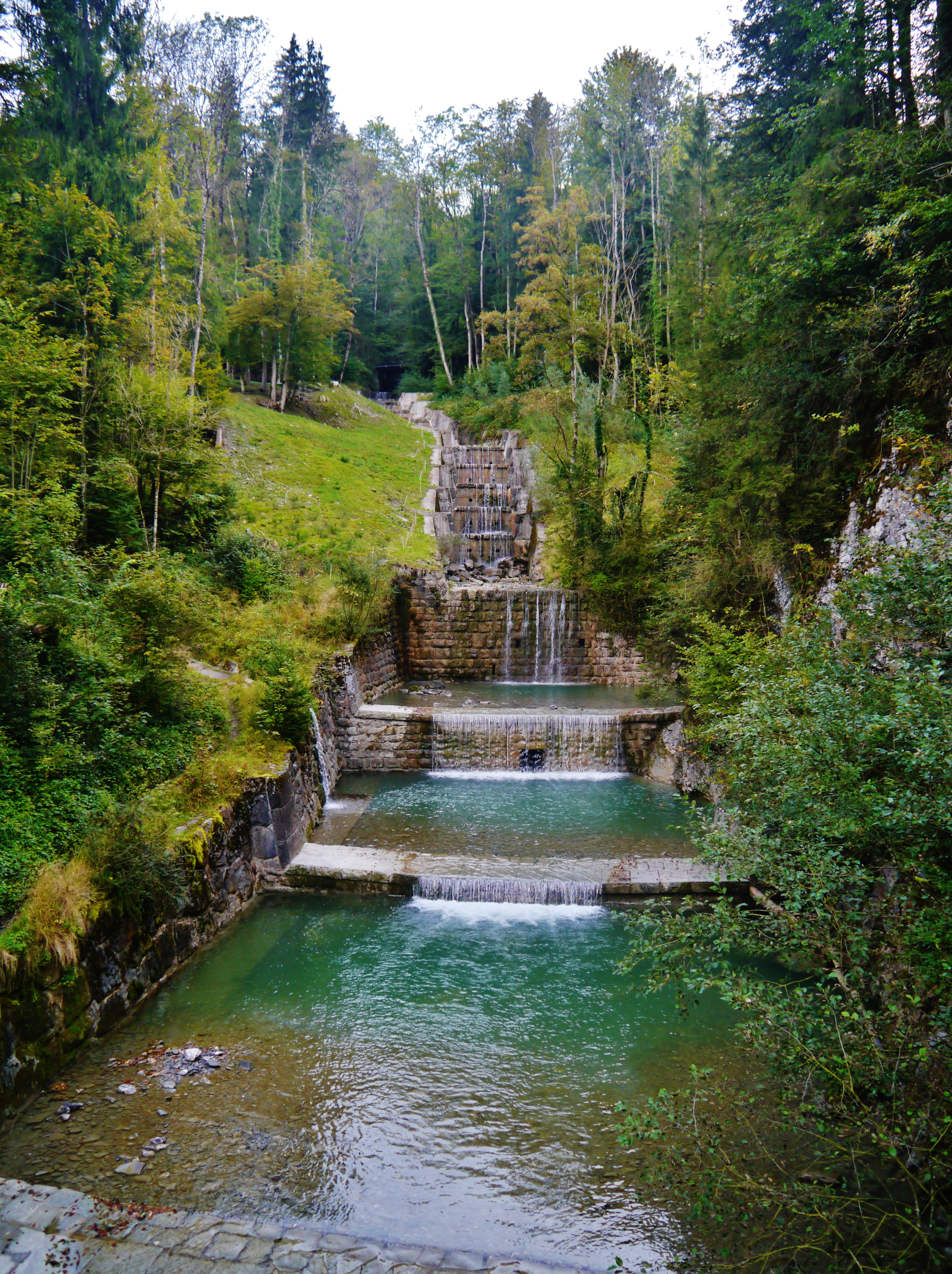
- Dornbirner Ach in the Rappenloch Gorge

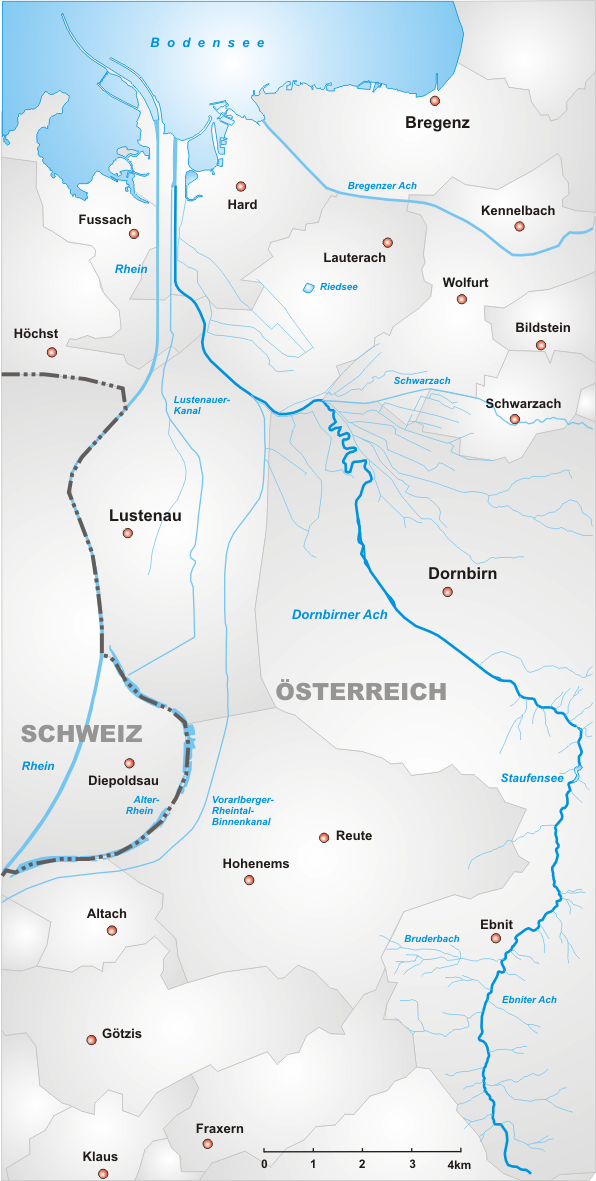

Location
- Country: Austria
- State: Vorarlberg

Physical characteristics
- Source
  - location: Vorarlberg
  - coordinates: 47°18′26″N 9°46′04″E
  - elevation: 1485 m
- Mouth
  - location: Lake Constance
  - coordinates: 47°29′55″N 9°40′31″E
  - elevation: 385 m
- Length: 29.9 km
- Basin size: 223 km^{2}

Basin features
- Progression: Rhine→ North Sea

The Dornbirner Ach (also called Dornbirner Ache) is a 29.9 km (18.6 mi) long stream in Vorarlberg, Austria, and a tributary of Lake Constance (Bodensee) and the Rhine, respectively. It flows through two gorges in its upper part, the Alploch Gorge and the Rappenloch Gorge.

== Course ==
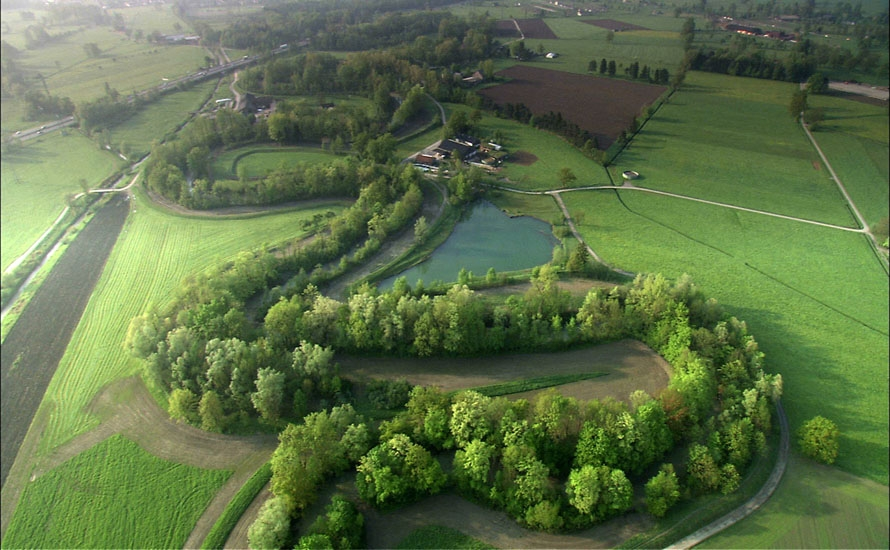
Meanders northwest of Dornbirn

The river's source is located in the mountains near the alpine village of Ebnit (Dornbirn). Downstream, the river flows through one of the largest and most gorgeous gorges in Central Europe, the Alplochschlucht (English: Alploch Gorge) and Rappenlochschlucht (English: Rappenloch Gorge), which are separated by a small reservoir lake (Staufensee). Further downstream, the river cuts through the town of Dornbirn and then meanders off over a broad meadow landscape, the Lauterach Ried in the Alpine Rhine Valley, finally flowing into Upper Lake Constance.

The mouth of the river was originally near Fussach, but since the straightening of the Alpine Rhine, it flows parallel and quite close to the latter into Lake Constance near Hard. Its mouth lies west of the Bregenzer Ach.

Some of its tributaries are the Kugelbach, Bruderbach, Spätenbach, Gunzenach/Kobelach and Schwarzach.

== Gallery ==
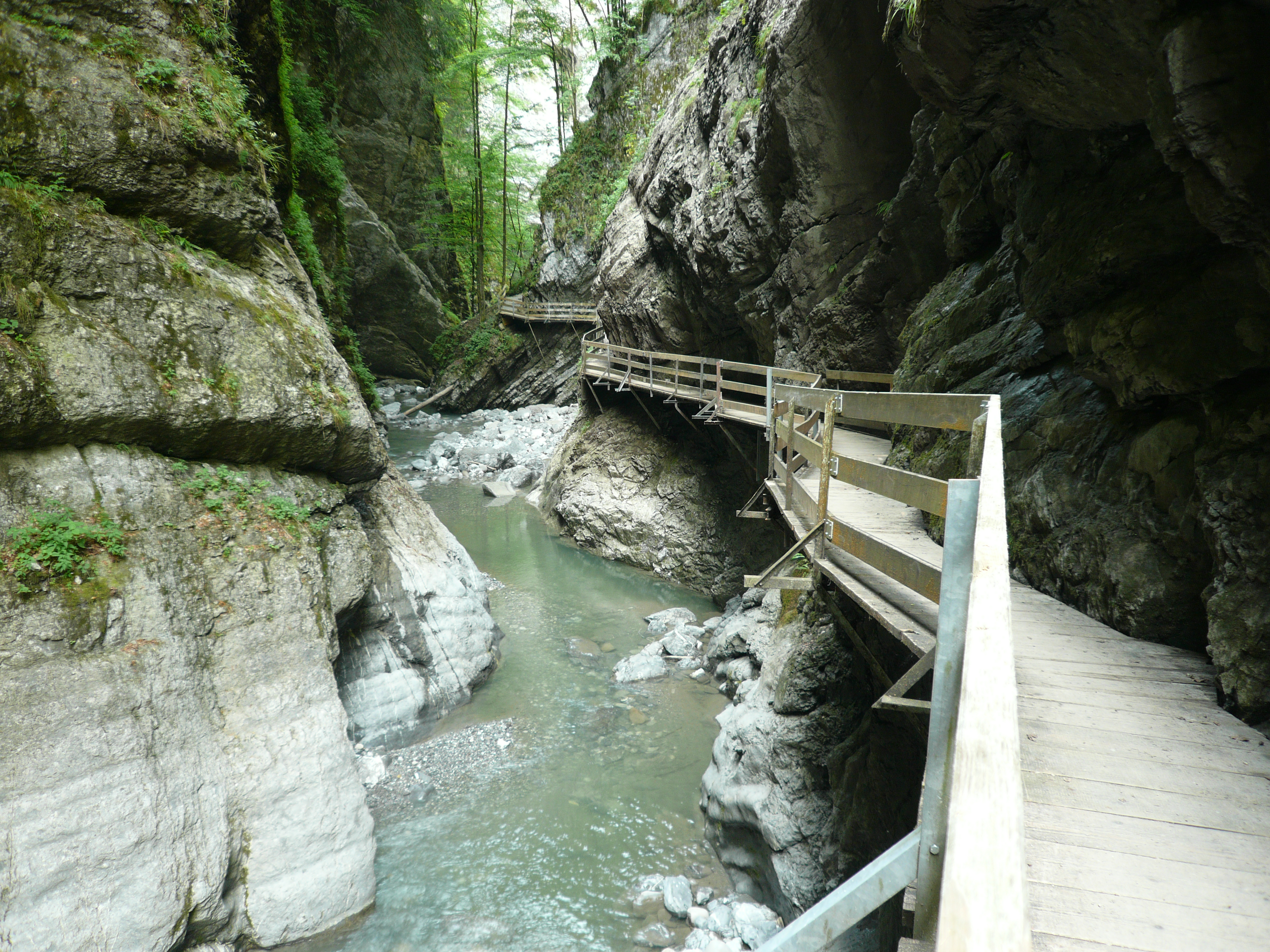
Alploch Gorge

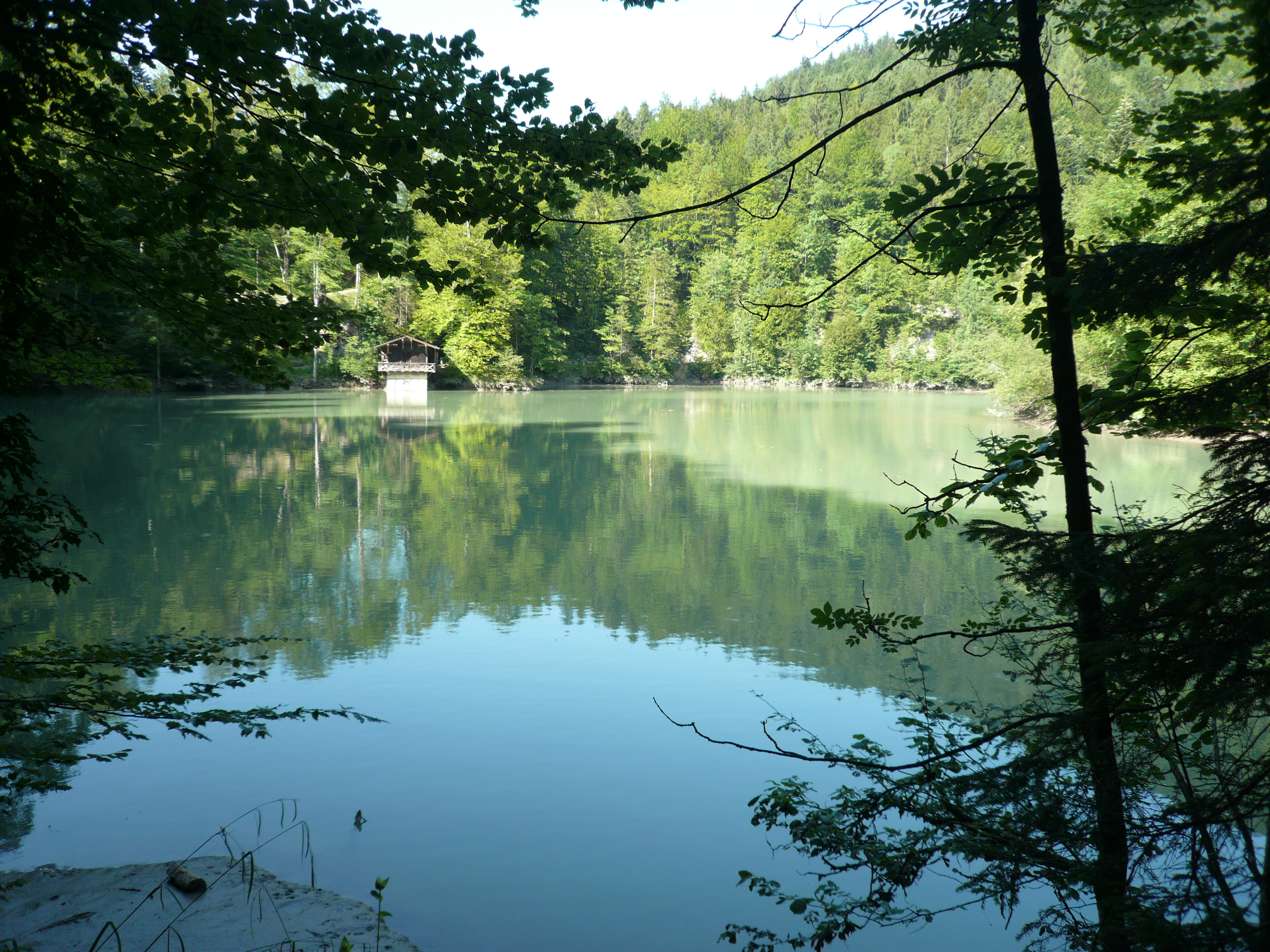
Staufensee

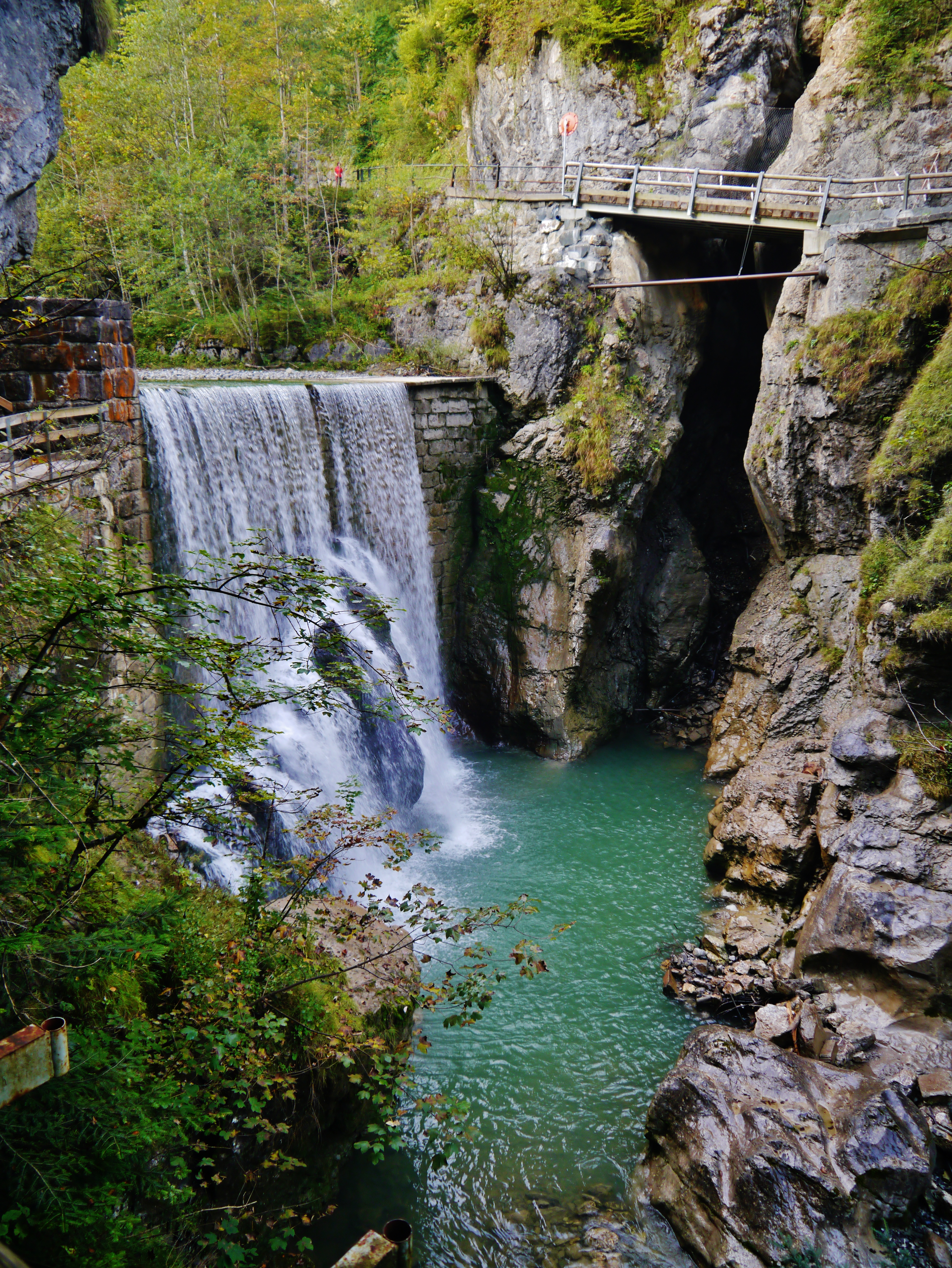
Rappenloch Gorge

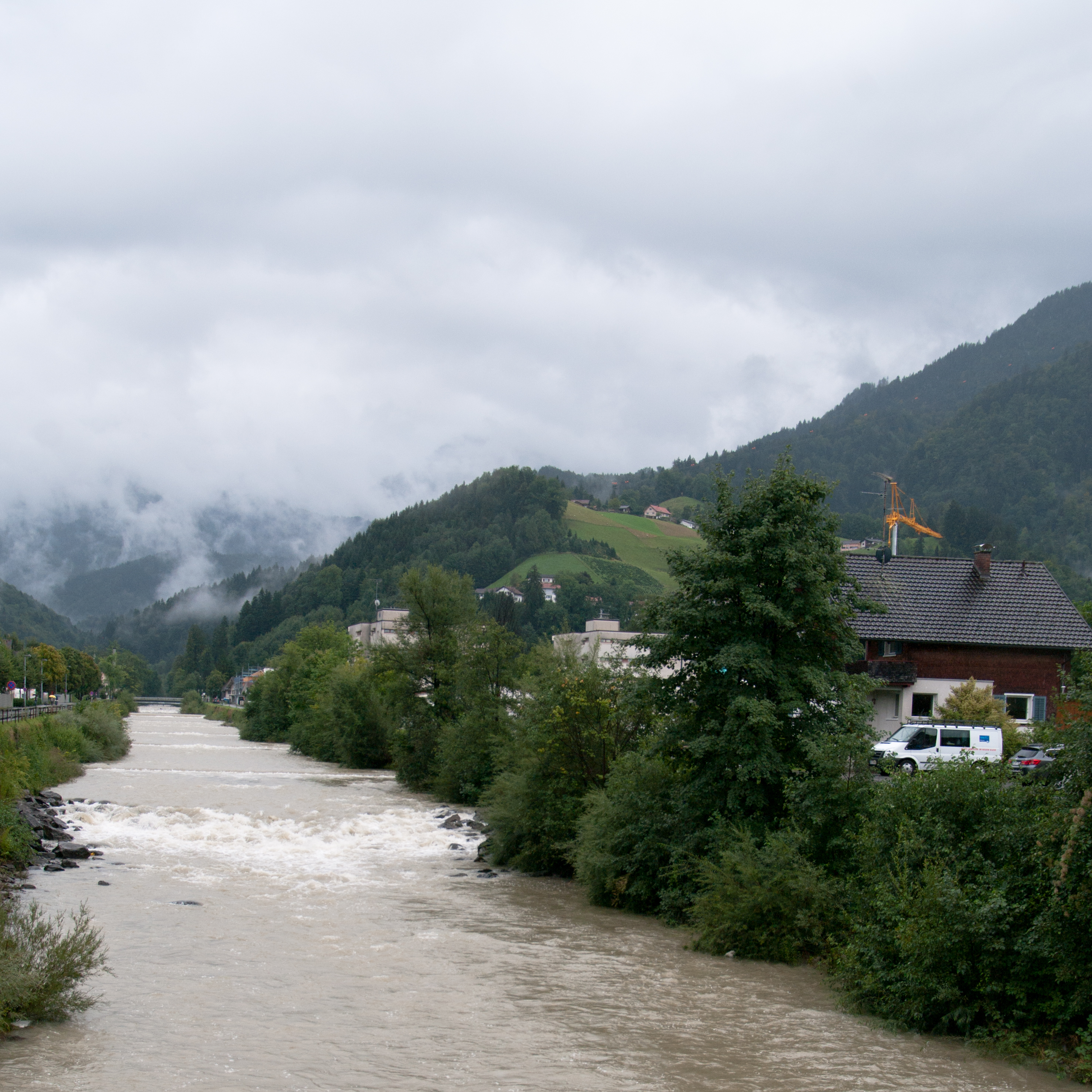
Dornbirn

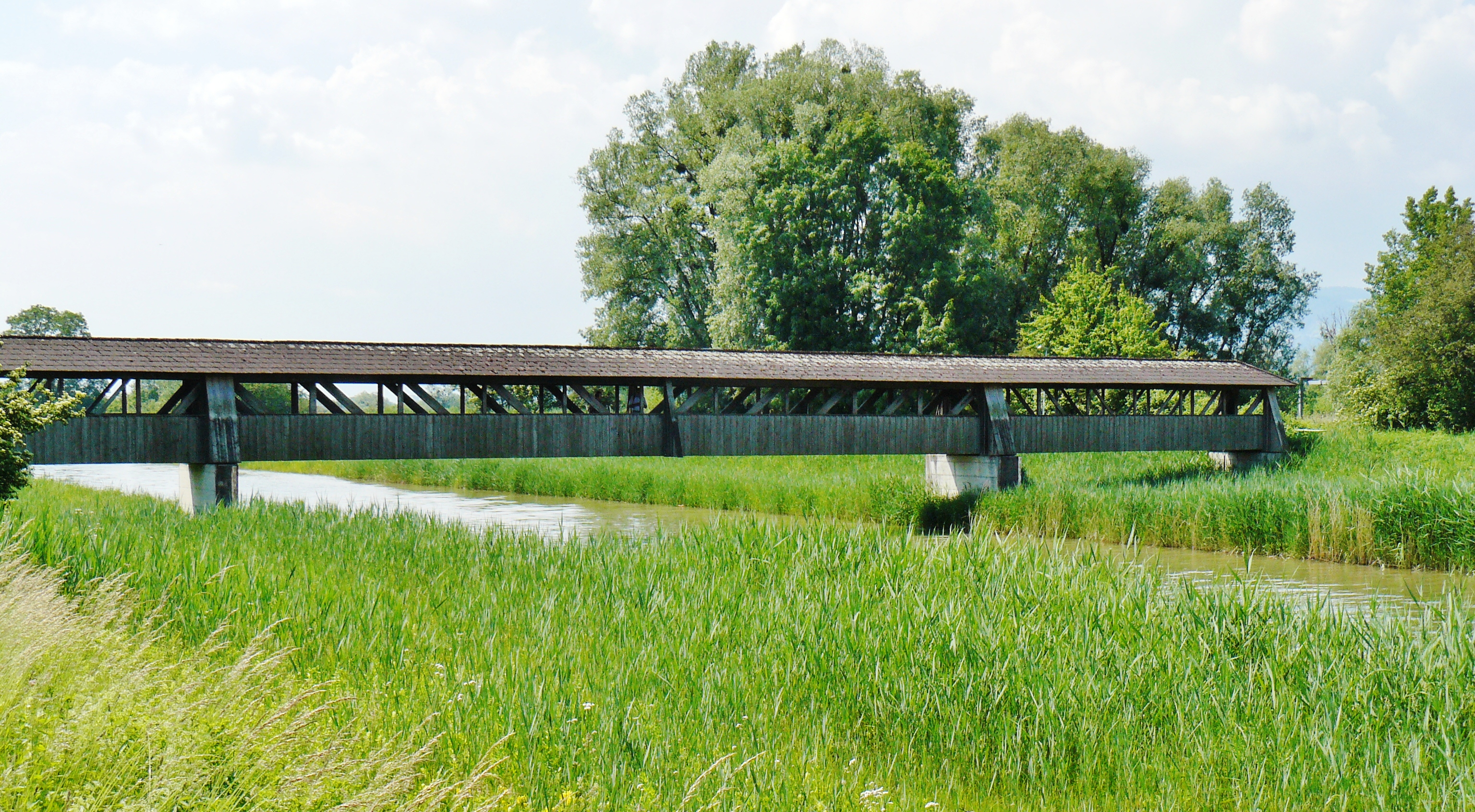
Bridge near the river's mouth

== See also ==
- Bregenz Forest Mountains
- Rivers in Austria
