= Schnepfau =

- Municipality
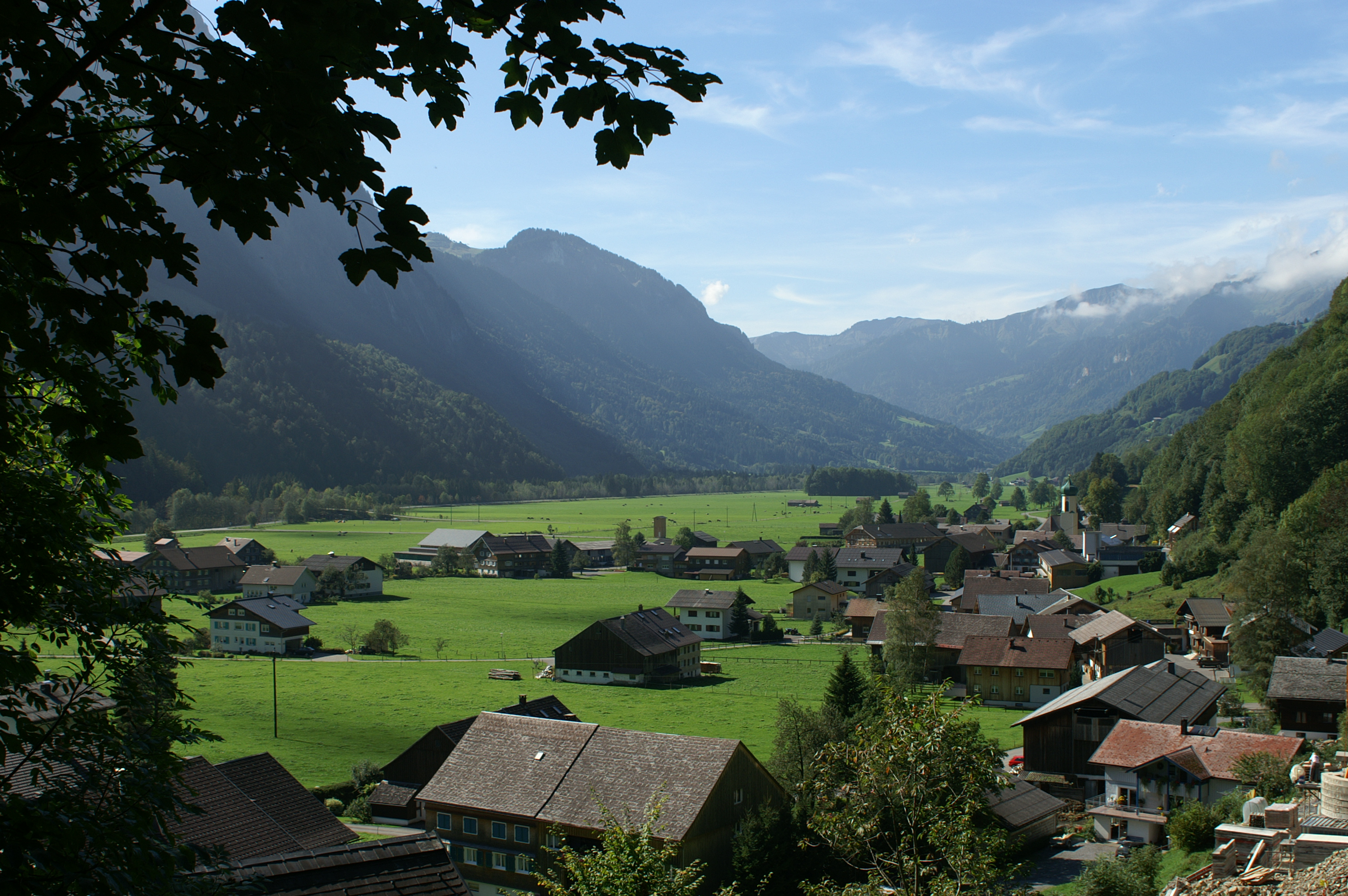

- Coat of arms

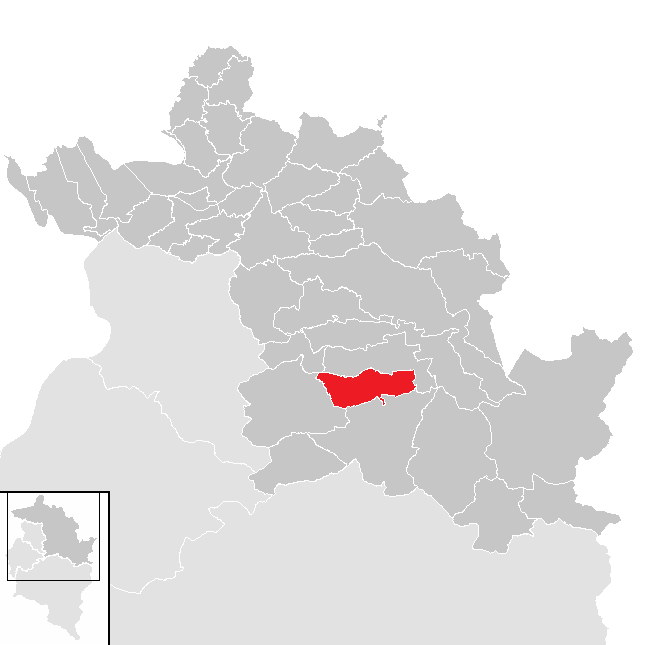
- Location in the district

- Location within Austria
- Coordinates: 47°21′00″N 09°56′00″E
- Country: Austria
- State: Vorarlberg
- District: Bregenz

Government
  - Mayor: Josef Moosbrugger

Area
  - Total: 16.53 km^{2} (6.38 sq mi)
- Elevation: 734 m (2,408 ft)

Population (2018-01-01)
  - Total: 449
  - Density: 27.2/km^{2} (70.4/sq mi)
- Time zone: UTC+1 (CET)
  - Summer (DST): UTC+2 (CEST)
- Postal code: 6882
- Area code: 05518
- Vehicle registration: B
- Website: www.schnepfau.at

Schnepfau is a municipality in the district of Bregenz in the Austrian state of Vorarlberg.

== Population ==
Historical population
Year	Pop.	±%
1869	409	—
1880	360	−12.0%
1890	346	−3.9%
1900	291	−15.9%
1910	302	+3.8%
1923	315	+4.3%
1934	339	+7.6%
1939	329	−2.9%
1951	406	+23.4%
1961	378	−6.9%
1971	339	−10.3%
1981	373	+10.0%
1991	432	+15.8%
2001	483	+11.8%
2011	473	−2.1%
