= Glatthorn =

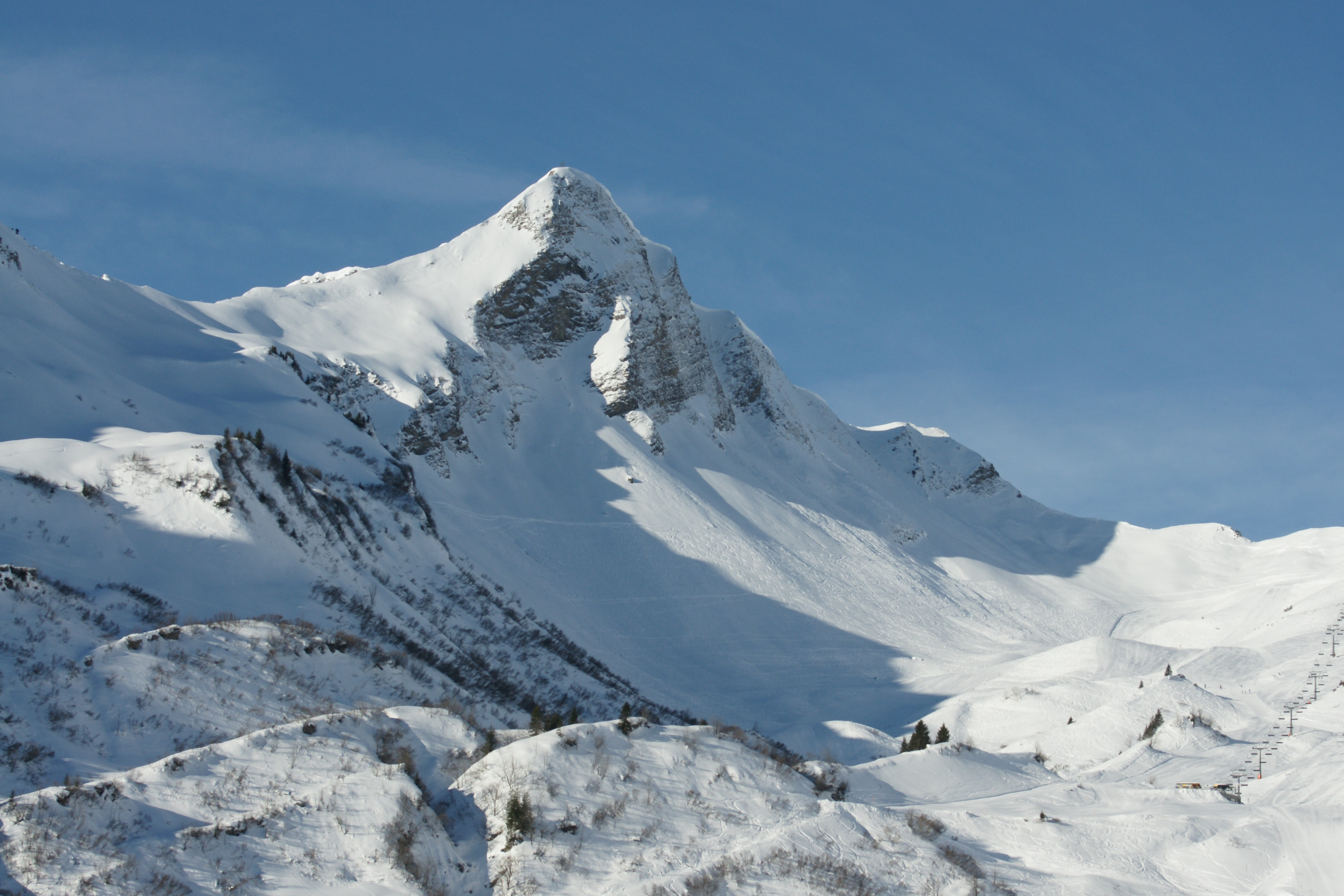
- View of the Glatthorn from the east

Highest point
- Elevation: 2,133 m (AA) (6,998 ft)
- Prominence: 2,133-1,486 m ↓ Faschinajoch
- Isolation: 6.2 km → Zitterklapfen
- Coordinates: 47°15′55″N 9°52′47″E

Geography
- Location within Austria
- Location: Vorarlberg, Austria
- Parent range: Bregenzerwaldgebirge

The Glatthorn (obsolete: Damülser Horn) in Vorarlberg in Austria is the highest mountain in the Bregenz Forest Mountains with a height of 2,133 m (AA). It lies west of and above the saddle of Faschinajoch, between Damüls to the north and Fontanella in the Großwalsertal to the south.
