= Karren =

Mountain in Austria

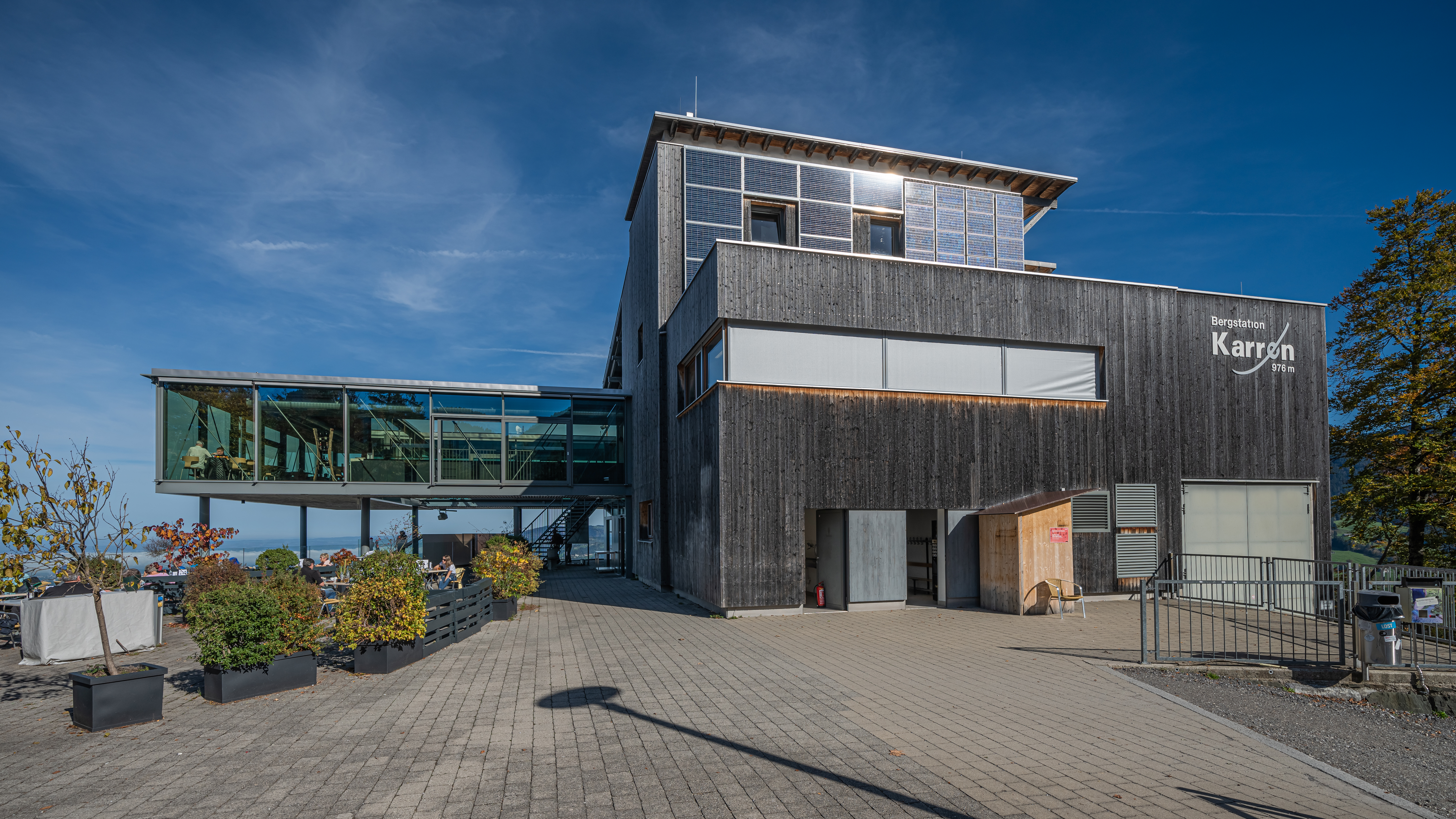
- The panorama restaurant on the top of the karren.

Highest point
- Elevation: 971 m (3,186 ft)
- Prominence: 27 m (89 ft)
- Parent peak: Staufen (line parent)
- Isolation: 0.3 km (0.19 mi) to P.973
- Coordinates: 47°23′14″N 9°45′3″E

Geography
- Location: Vorarlberg, Austria

The Karren is a mountain shoulder of Staufen in the urban municipality of Dornbirn, in Western Austria.

A cable car goes to the top of the mountain. The summit station includes a panorama restaurant with an expansive view of Switzerland and Germany and the Rhine Valley.
