= Subersach =

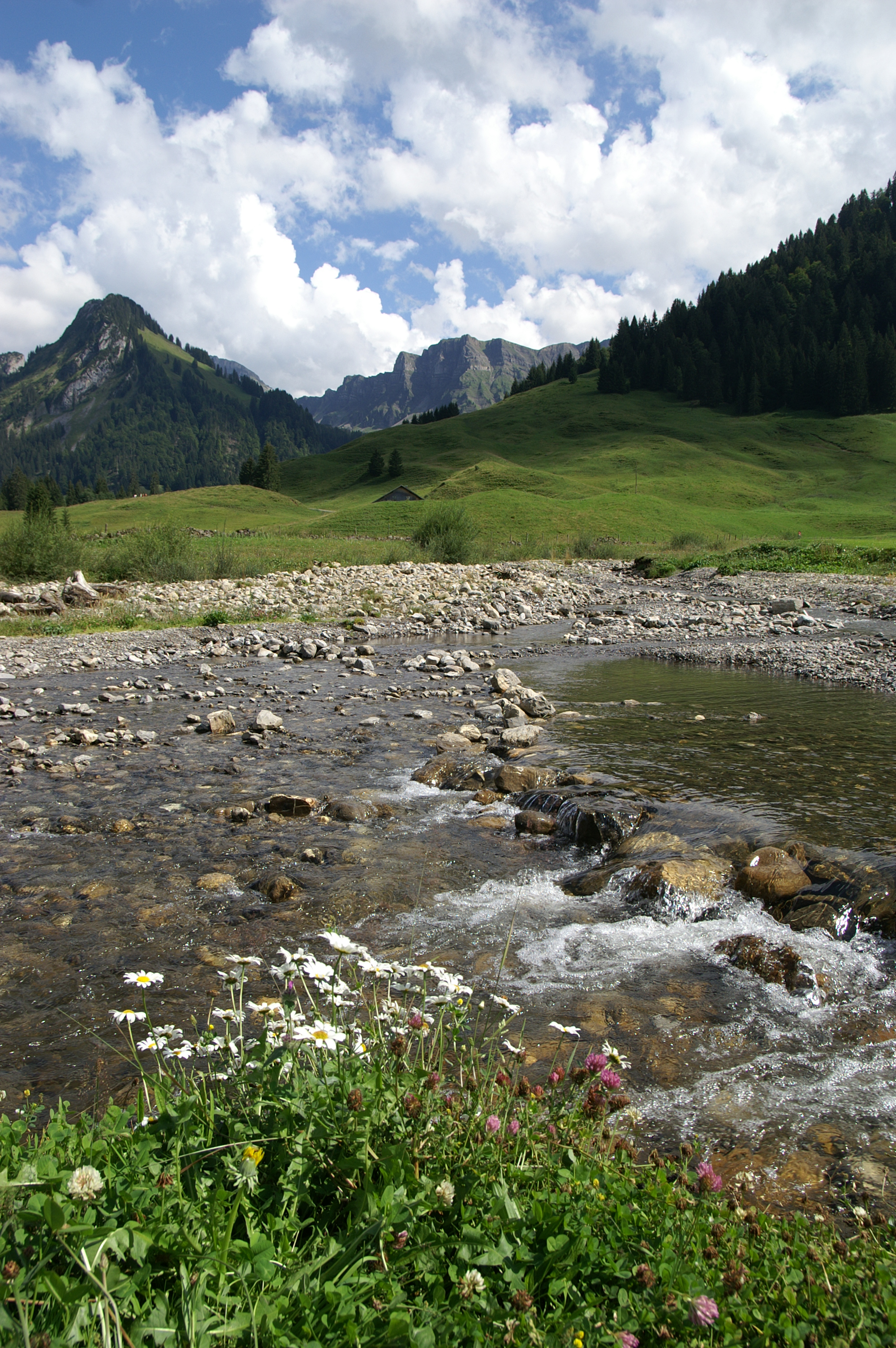
- The Subersach in Schönenbach, Bezau. In the background the Hählekopf (2,058 m (AA))

Location
- Country: Austria
- State: Vorarlberg

Physical characteristics
- Source
  - location: near the Hählekopf
  - elevation: ~ 1,700 m (5,600 ft)
- Mouth
  - location: Bregenzer Ach
  - coordinates: 47°26′39″N 9°53′34″E
- Length: ~ 20 km (12 mi)

Basin features
- Progression: Bregenzer Ach→ Lake Constance→ Rhine→ North Sea

The Subersach is a river of Vorarlberg, Austria, a tributary of the Bregenzer Ach.

The Subersach originates near the mountain Hählekopf at 1,700 m (AA). Its course is strongly curved and resembles an arc. It merges with the Bregenzer Ach below Egg.
