= Staufen, Austria =

Staufen
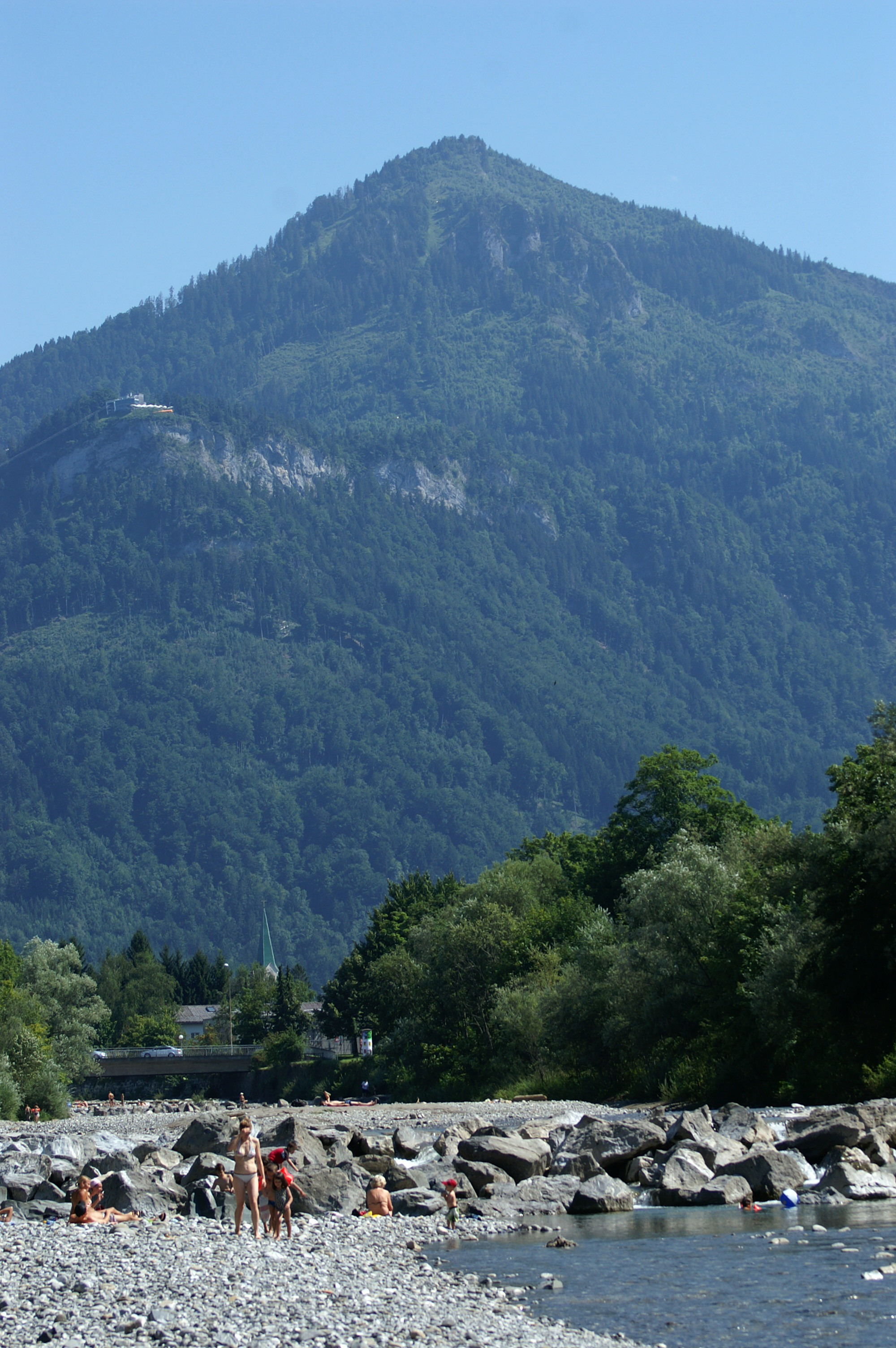

Highest point
- Elevation: 1,465 m (4,806 ft)
- Prominence: 315 m (1,033 ft)
- Parent peak: Wendkopf (line parent)
- Isolation: 1.83 km (1.14 mi) to Schwarzenberg
- Coordinates: 47°22′33.97″N 9°45′16.15″E

Geography
- Location: Vorarlberg, Austria

The Staufen is a 1465 metre high mountain in the Bregenz Forest Mountains in the far west of Austria. It separates the two bordering cities of Dornbirn and Hohenems. The Staufen is connected to the Karren mountain, which is within the bounds of the city of Dornbirn.
