= Bregenzer Ach =

River in Vorarlberg, Austria

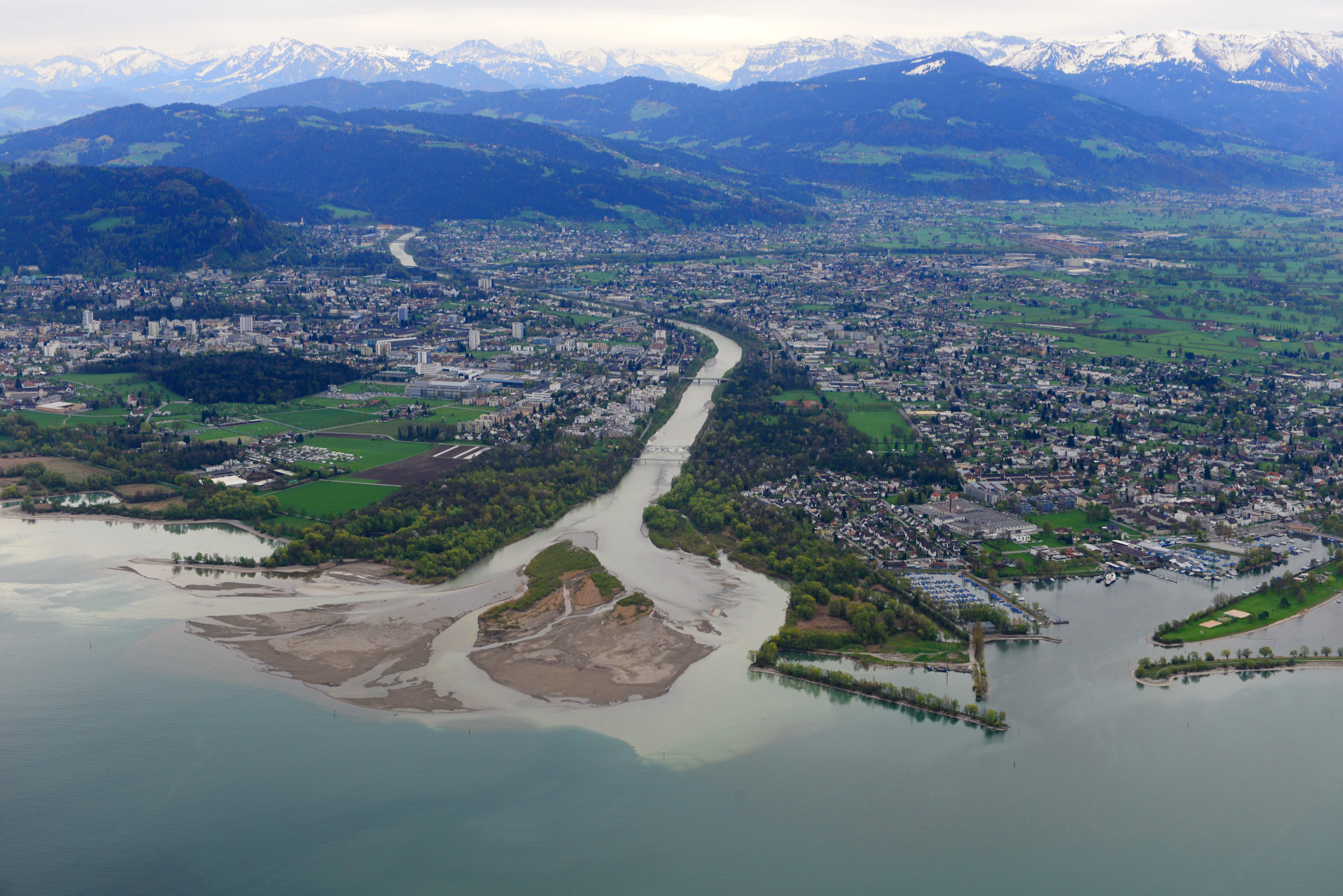
- Mouth of the river on Upper Lake Constance

Location
- Country: Austria
- State: Vorarlberg

Physical characteristics
- Source
  - location: Mohnenfluh in the Bregenz Forest Mountains near Schröcken
  - elevation: 2,400 m (7,900 ft)
- Mouth
  - location: Lake Constance at Hard
  - coordinates: 47°30′12″N 9°41′37″E
  - elevation: 395 m (1,296 ft)
- Length: 67.0 km (41.6 mi)
- Basin size: 832 km^{2} (321 sq mi)

Basin features
- Progression: Lake Constance→ Rhine→ North Sea
- Tributaries
  - right: Weißach, Subersach

The Bregenzer Ach (also: Bregenzer Ache) is the main river of the Bregenz Forest (Bregenzerwald) in the Austrian state of Vorarlberg. It is a tributary to Lake Constance and the River Rhine, respectively.

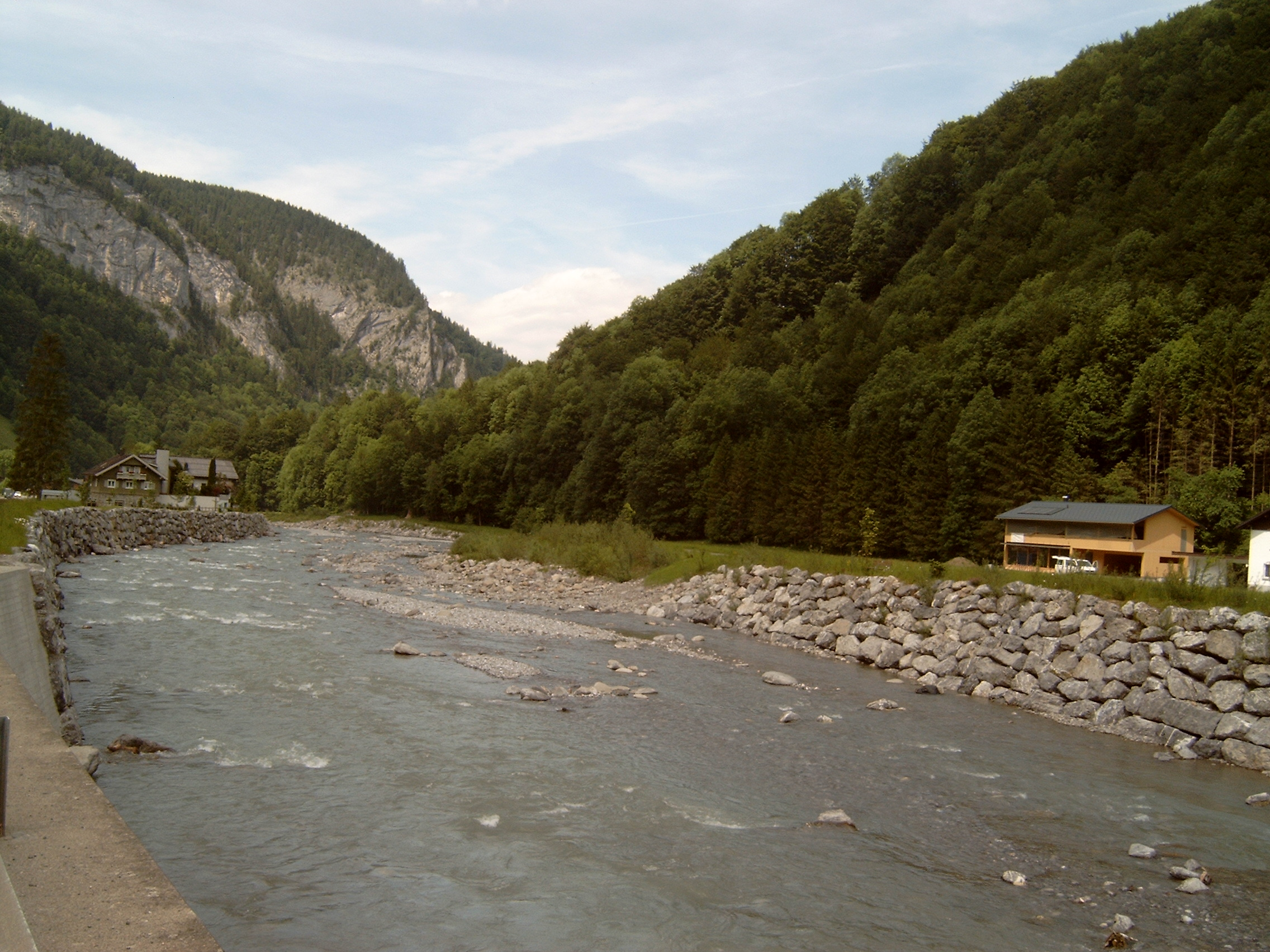
Bregenzer Ache between Mellau and Bezau

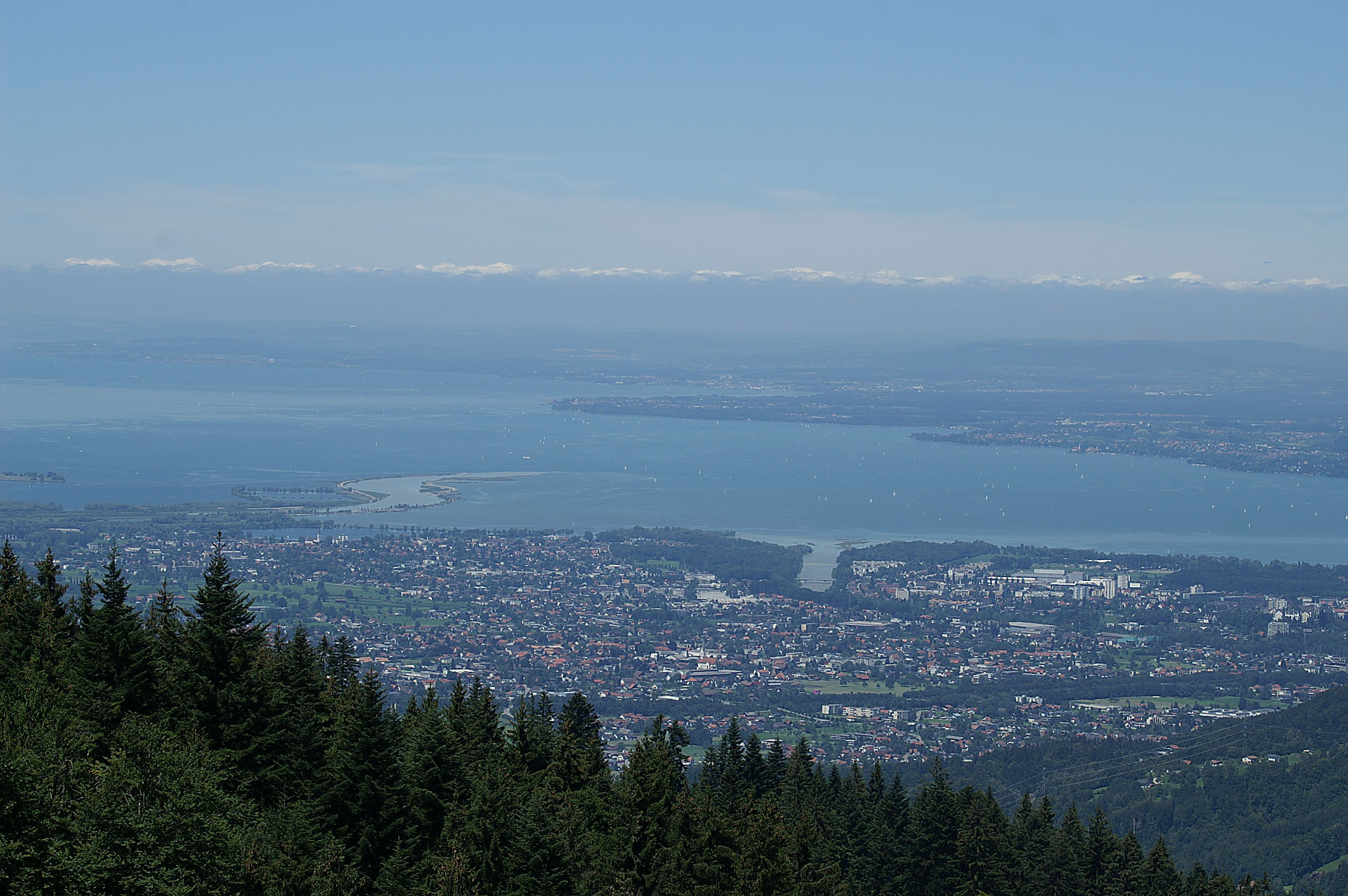
Bregenzer Ache (right) enters Lake Constance east of the Alpine Rhine in Hard

== Geography ==
The source of the river is above the town of Schröcken, at an altitude of about 2,400 m (7,900 ft). The river is 67 km (42 mi) long and drains almost the entire area of the Bregenz Forest. Its mouth on Upper Lake Constance (Obersee) is near Bregenz and lies east of the outflows of the rivers Dornbirner Ach and Alpine Rhine. The outflow of Lake Constance is the High Rhine.

== See also ==
- Bregenz Forest Mountains
- List of rivers of Austria
