= Reinhold Einwallner =

Austrian politician (born 1973)

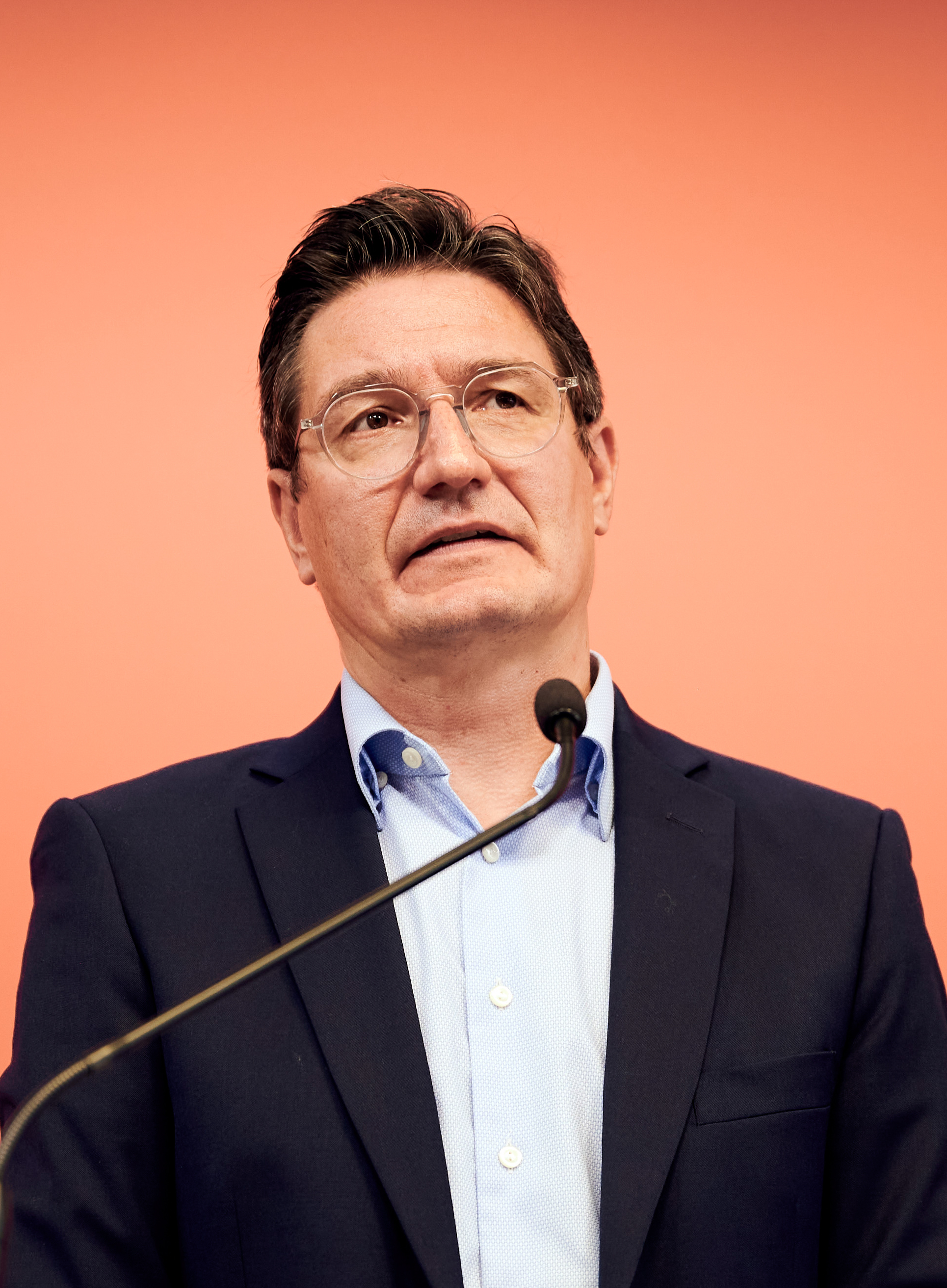
- Einwallner in August 2021

Member of the National Council
- Incumbent
- Assumed office 9 November 2017
- Constituency: Vorarlberg

Member of the Landtag of Vorarlberg
- In office 15 October 2014 – 31 October 2017
- Constituency: Bregenz

Member of the Federal Council
- In office 5 October 2004 – 13 October 2009
- Constituency: Vorarlberg

Personal details
- Born: 13 May 1973 (age 52) Bruck an der Mur, Austria
- Party: Social Democratic Party

Reinhold Einwallner (born 13 May 1973) is an Austrian politician and member of the National Council. A member of the Social Democratic Party, he has represented Vorarlberg since November 2017. He was a member of the Landtag of Vorarlberg from October 2014 to October 2017 and a member of the Federal Council from October 2004 to October 2009.

Einwallner was born on 13 May 1973 in Bruck an der Mur. He trained to be an optician at a vocational school from 1988 to 1992 before studying optometry at a higher technical college in Hall in Tirol from 1994 to 1997. He has been working as an optician since 1997 and has owned his own business since 2003. He was a member of the municipal councils in Hörbranz (2000 to 2015) and Bregenz (since 2020). He has held various positions in the Social Democratic Party (SPÖ)'s Vorarlberg branch and at the federal level.

Einwallner was appointed to the Federal Council by the Landtag of Vorarlberg following the 2004 state election. He was elected to the Landtag of Vorarlberg at the 2014 state election. He was elected to the National Council at the 2017 legislative election.

Einwallner is married and has one child.

Electoral history of Reinhold Einwallner
| Election | Electoral district | Party | Votes | % | Result |
|---|---|---|---|---|---|
| 2008 legislative | Vorarlberg North | Social Democratic Party | 220 | 1.62% | Not elected |
| 2008 legislative | Vorarlberg | Social Democratic Party | 5 | 0.02% | Not elected |
| 2013 legislative | Vorarlberg North | Social Democratic Party | 923 | 7.63% | Not elected |
| 2013 legislative | Vorarlberg | Social Democratic Party | 140 | 0.61% | Not elected |
| 2017 legislative | Vorarlberg North | Social Democratic Party | 2,543 | 13.59% | Not elected |
| 2017 legislative | Vorarlberg | Social Democratic Party | 642 | 1.84% | Elected |
| 2019 legislative | Vorarlberg North | Social Democratic Party | 2,050 | 15.69% | Not elected |
| 2019 legislative | Vorarlberg | Social Democratic Party | 483 | 1.99% | Elected |
| 2019 state | Bregenz | Social Democratic Party | 446 | 8.62% | Not elected |
| 2024 state | Bregenz | Social Democratic Party | 1,057 | 19.62% | Not elected |
