= State parliaments of Austria =

Composition of the state legislatures of Austria

The Austrian state parliaments are the unicameral legislatures of the nine Austrian states, according to the Constitution of Austria deciding in all matters unless explicitly subject of federal legislation. On federal level the state parliaments are represented in the Federal Council.

Nine political parties are represented in the state parliaments, of which six are represented in more than one. Currently, the Austrian People's Party (ÖVP), Social Democratic Party of Austria (SPÖ), and Freedom Party of Austria (FPÖ) are represented in all nine state parliaments. The Greens are represented in eight, and NEOS – The New Austria (NEOS) is represented in six. Also, the leftist-socialist Communist Party (KPÖ) is represented in two parliaments, while the fiscal-liberal and regionalist Team Carinthia, the populist MFG and the anti-corruption regionalist Citizens' Forum (FRITZ), are represented in one parliament each.

== Composition ==
State	Seats	ÖVP	SPÖ	FPÖ	Grüne	NEOS	KPÖ	TK	FRITZ	MFG	Term	Last election	Next election	Ref
Burgenland	36	8	**17**	9	2	–					5 years	2025	2030	
Carinthia	36	7	**15**	9	–	–		5			5 years	2023	2028	
Lower Austria	56	**23**	12	14	4	3					5 years	2023	2028	
Salzburg	36	**12**	7	10	3	–	4				5 years	2023	2028	
Styria	48	13	10	**17**	3	3	2				5 years	2024	2029	
Tyrol	36	**14**	7	7	3	2			3		5 years	2022	2027	
Upper Austria	56	**22**	11	11	7	2				3	6 years	2021	2027	
Vienna	100	10	**43**	22	15	10					5 years	2025	2030	
Vorarlberg	36	**15**	3	11	4	3					5 years	2024	2029	

Parties involved in government are shaded; parties leading governments are indicated in bold.

== Diagrams ==
Burgenland

Carinthia

Lower Austria

Upper Austria

Salzburg

Styria

Tyrol

Vorarlberg

Vienna

== States Map ==
FPÖ
Senior coalition partner
Junior coalition partner
In opposition

ÖVP
Senior coalition partner
Junior coalition partner
In opposition

SPÖ
Senior coalition partner
Junior coalition partner
Part of a Proporz government
In opposition

Grüne
Junior coalition partner
Part of a Proporz government
In opposition
Extraparliamentary

KPÖ
In opposition
Extraparliamentary
