= Christoph Metzler (politician) =

Austrian politician

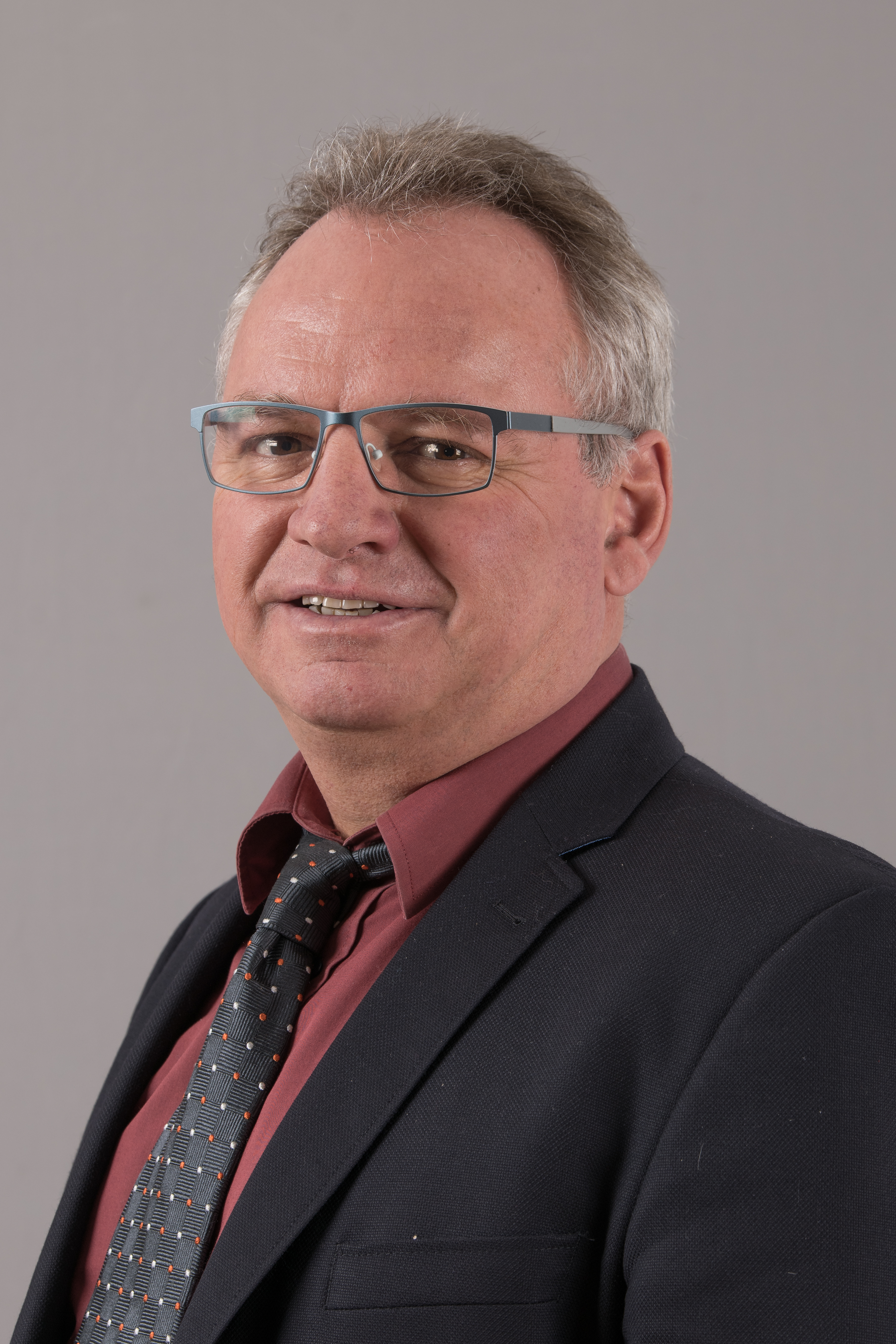
Christoph Metzler (2017)

Christoph Metzler (born 14 February 1963) is an Austrian Green Party politician. Since 2014 he has been a member of the Landtag of Vorarlberg. He is divorced and has two adult daughters.

After completing his bricklaying apprenticeship, he graduated from a building school and worked as a journeyman bricklayer, foreman and site foreman and since 1988 has also worked as a construction manager. He also works as a construction manager in urban water engineering.

== Political career ==
He is one of the founder members of the Green Party in his birthplace and hometown of Rankweil, known as the Grünen Forum Rankweil. Since April 1995 he has been a member of the municipal council and was a member of the municipal board. From 1996 to 2020 he was also a municipal councillor. In the run-up to the 2020 Vorarlberg municipal and mayoral elections, Metzler gave up his candidacy for the Rankweiler Greens in order to concentrate on being party chairman in the municipal council and his mandate in the state parliament. In 2013, Metzler was elected to the Greens' state executive board for Vorarlberg.

Following the Green Party's electoral victory in the 2014 Vorarlberg state election, Metzler was elected to the Vorarlberg State Parliament. Metzler also secured a seat in the Feldkirch constituency in the 2019 Vorarlberg state election. As spokesperson for the Green Party's parliamentary group, he is responsible for the portfolios of environmental protection, nature conservation, climate protection (including natural hazards), housing, transport, energy/water management, and waste management.

== External links (in German) ==
- Christoph Metzler on the Vorarlberger Landtag website
- Biography on the Vorarlberger Landtag website.
- Christoph Metzler Vorarlberger Green Party website.
- Christoph Metzler on meineabgeordneten.at.
