= 2015 Viennese state election =

Election in Vienna, Austria

- 11 October 2015

All 100 seats in the Gemeinderat and Landtag of Vienna 51 seats needed for a majority All 13 seats in the state government
- Turnout: 854,406 (74.7%) ▲7.1%
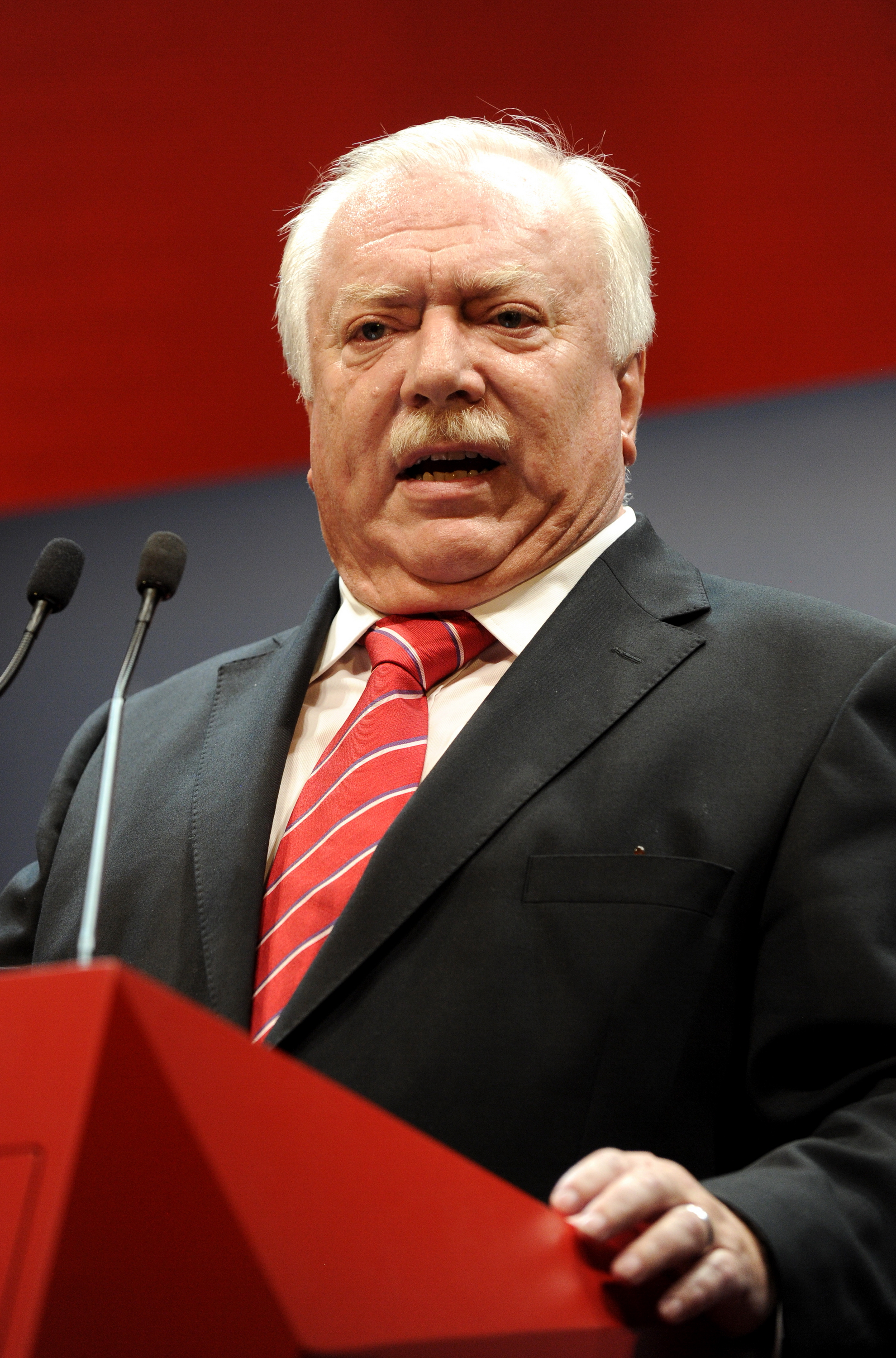

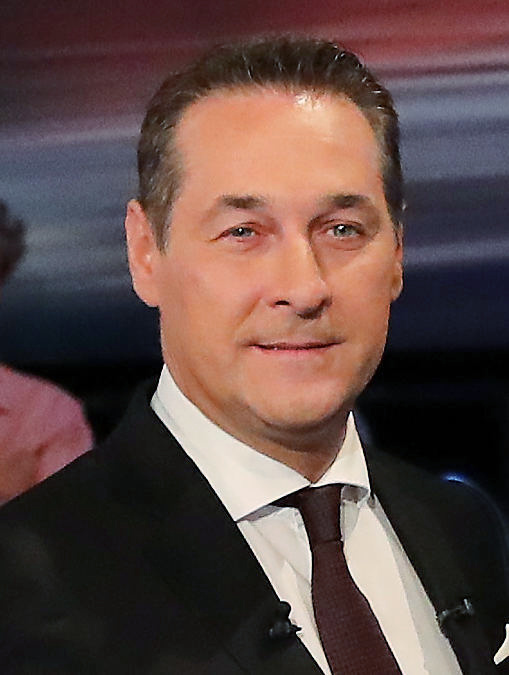

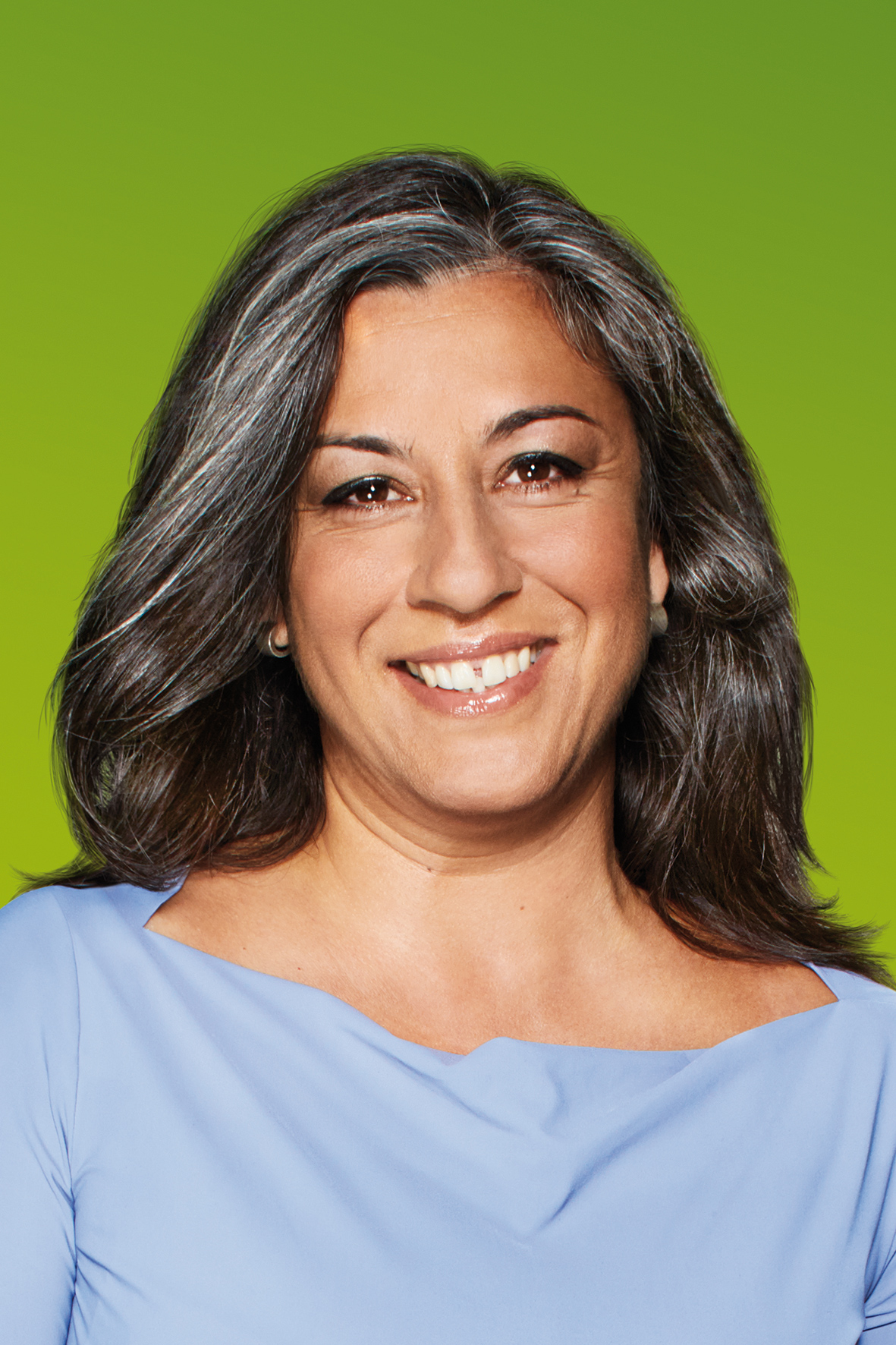

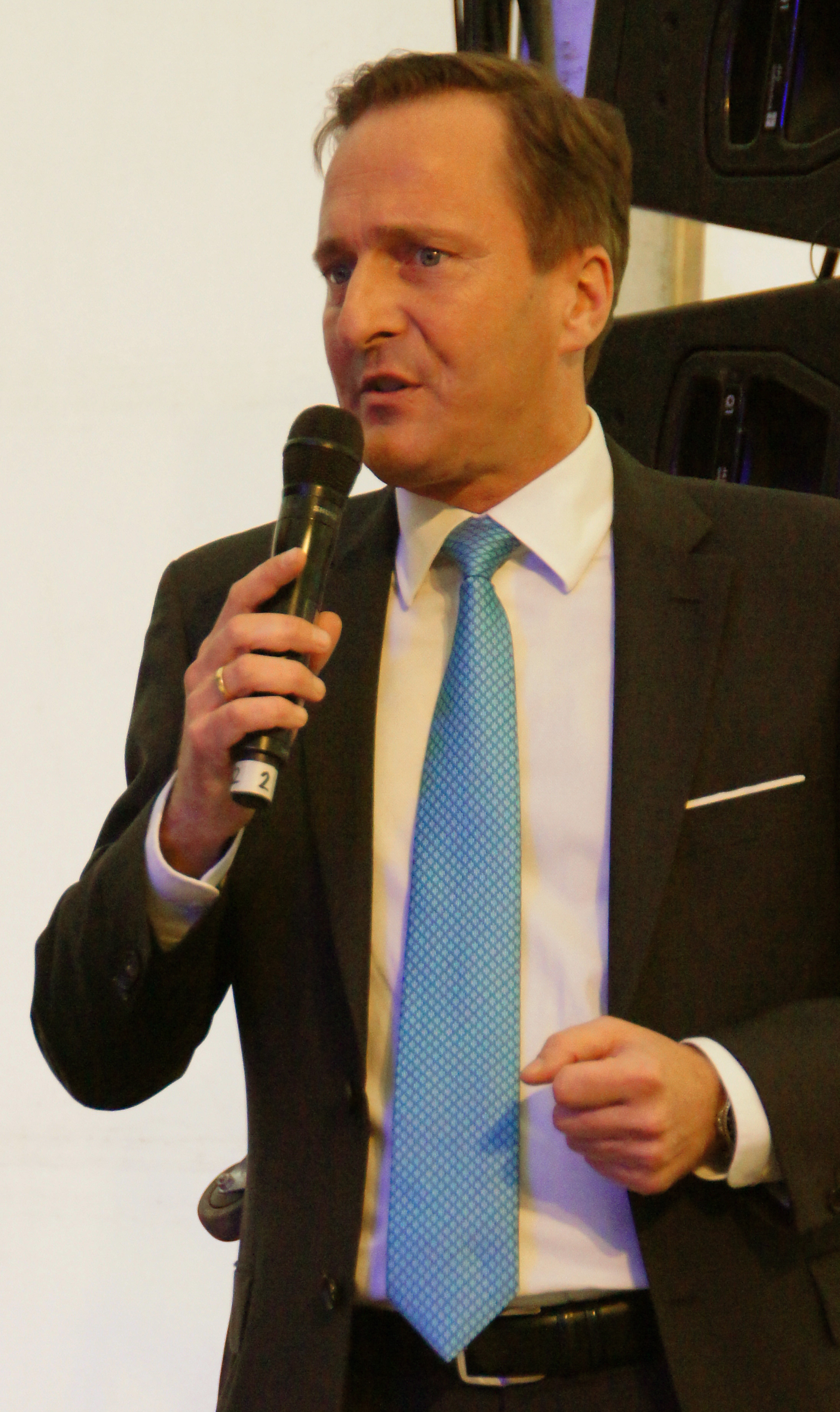

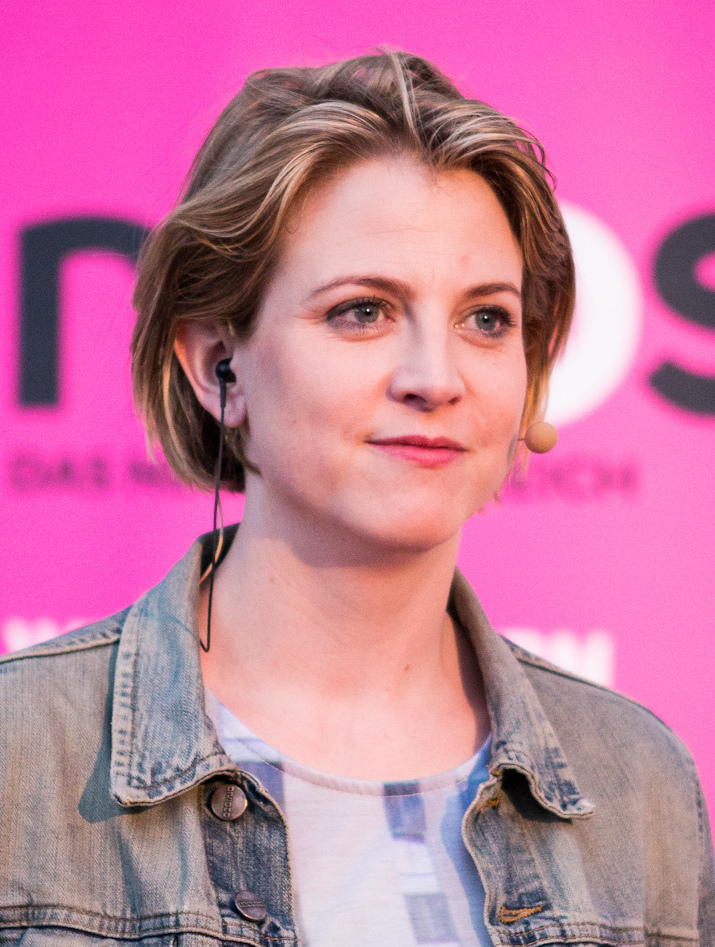
	First party	Second party	Third party
Leader	Michael Häupl	Heinz-Christian Strache	Maria Vassilakou
Party	SPÖ	FPÖ	Greens
Last election	49 seats, 44.3%	27 seats, 25.8%	11 seats, 12.6%
Seats won	44	34	10
Seat change	▼5	▲7	▼1
Popular vote	329,772	256,448	98,626
Percentage	39.6%	30.8%	11.8%
Swing	▼4.7%	▲5.0%	▼0.8%
	Fourth party	Fifth party
Leader	Manfred Juraczka	Beate Meinl-Reisinger
Party	ÖVP	NEOS
Last election	13 seats, 14.0%	Did not exist
Seats won	7	5
Seat change	▼6	▲5
Popular vote	76,958	51,305
Percentage	9.2%	6.2%
Swing	▼4.8%	New party
- Results by district.
Mayor and Governor before election
Michael Häupl
SPÖ
Elected Mayor and Governor
Michael Häupl
SPÖ

The 2015 Viennese state election was held on 11 October 2015 to elect the members of the Gemeinderat and Landtag of Vienna.

The election saw losses for the centre-left Social Democratic Party of Austria (SPÖ) and conservative Austrian People's Party (ÖVP), the traditional major parties of Austrian politics, and gains for the right-wing populist Freedom Party of Austria (FPÖ) and liberal NEOS – The New Austria (NEOS). The SPÖ recorded its worst result since 1996, while the ÖVP suffered its worst-ever result in an Austrian election, placing fourth with just 9.2% of votes.

== Background ==
The Viennese constitution mandates that cabinet positions in the city government (city councillors, German: Stadtsräten) be allocated between parties proportionally in accordance with the share of votes won by each; this is known as Proporz. The number of city councillors is voted upon by the Landtag after each election, and may legally vary between nine and fifteen. City councillors are divided into two groups – "senior" councillors, who hold a cabinet portfolio, and "non-executive" councillors who do not. Non-executive councillors may vote in cabinet meetings, but do not otherwise hold any government responsibility. In practice, parties seek to form a coalition which holds a majority in both the Landtag and the city government. City councillors bound to the coalition become senior councillors, while the opposition are relegated to non-executive status.

In the 2010 state election, the SPÖ lost its majority. The SPÖ won eight councillors, the FPÖ three, the ÖVP one, and the Greens one. The SPÖ formed a coalition with the Greens.

== Electoral system ==
The 100 seats of the Gemeinderat and Landtag of Vienna are elected via open list proportional representation in a two-step process. The seats are distributed between eighteen multi-member constituencies. For parties to receive any representation in the Landtag, they must either win at least one seat in a constituency directly or clear a 5 per cent state-wide electoral threshold. Seats are distributed in constituencies according to the Droop quota, with any remaining seats allocated using the D'Hondt method applied to surplus votes at the state level, to ensure overall semiproportionality between a party's vote share and its share of seats.

== Contesting parties ==
The table below lists parties represented in the previous Landtag.

Name		Ideology	Leader	2010 result		
Name		Ideology	Leader	Votes (%)	Seats	Councillors
SPÖ	Social Democratic Party of Austria; Sozialdemokratische Partei Österreichs	Social democracy	Michael Häupl	44.3%	49 / 100	8 / 13
FPÖ	Freedom Party of Austria; Freiheitliche Partei Österreichs	Right-wing populism Euroscepticism	Heinz-Christian Strache	25.8%	27 / 100	3 / 13
ÖVP	Austrian People's Party; Österreichische Volkspartei	Christian democracy	Manfred Juraczka	14.0%	13 / 100	1 / 13
GRÜNE	The Greens – The Green Alternative; Die Grünen – Die Grüne Alternative	Green politics	Maria Vassilakou	12.6%	11 / 100	1 / 13

In addition to the parties already represented in the Landtag, eight parties collected enough signatures to be placed on the ballot.

- NEOS – The New Austria (NEOS)
- Vienna Differently (ANDAS)
- Together for Vienna (GfW)
- We want Freedom of Choice - List Pollischansky (WWW) (with Team Stronach and Alliance for the Future of Austria)
- We for Floridsdorf (WIFF) – on the ballot only in Floridsdorf
- Men's Party (M) – on the ballot only in Donaustadt
- Socialist Left Party (SLP) – on the ballot only in Brigittenau
- Free Democrats (FREIE) – on the ballot only in the Centre

== Results ==
Party	Votes	%	+/−	Seats	+/−	Coun.	+/−
Social Democratic Party of Austria (SPÖ)	329,773	39.59	–4.75	44	–5	7	–1
Freedom Party of Austria (FPÖ)	256,451	30.79	+5.02	34	+7	4	+1
The Greens – The Green Alternative (GRÜNE)	98,626	11.84	–0.80	10	–1	1	±0
Austrian People's Party (ÖVP)	76,959	9.24	–4.75	7	–6	1	±0
NEOS – The New Austria (NEOS)	51,305	6.16	New	5	New	0	New
Vienna Differently (ANDAS)	8,937	1.07	New	0	New	0	New
Together for Vienna (GfW)	7,608	0.91	New	0	New	0	New
We want Freedom of Choice - List Pollischansky (WWW)	1,709	0.21	New	0	New	0	New
We for Floridsdorf (WIFF)	1,346	0.16	New	0	New	0	New
Men's Party (M)	152	0.02	New	0	New	0	New
Socialist Left Party (SLP)	62	0.01	±0.00	0	±0	0	±0
Free Democrats (FREIE)	59	0.01	New	0	New	0	New
Invalid/blank votes	21,419	–	–	–	–	–	–
Total	854,406	100	–	100	0	13	0
Registered voters/turnout	1,143,076	74.75	+7.12	–	–	–	–
Source: Viennese Government

Popular vote
SPÖ	39.59%
FPÖ	30.79%
GRÜNE	11.84%
ÖVP	9.24%
NEOS	6.16%
Other	2.38%

Gemeinderat and Landtag seats
SPÖ	44.00%
FPÖ	34.00%
GRÜNE	10.00%
ÖVP	7.00%
NEOS	5.00%

=== Results by constituency ===
Constituency	SPÖ		FPÖ		Grüne		ÖVP		NEOS		Others	Total seats	Turnout
Constituency	%	S	%	S	%	S	%	S	%	S	%	Total seats	Turnout
Centre	39.2	3	20.4	1	18.9	1	11.1		8.4		2.0	5	75.2
Inner West	37.5	2	17.3	1	22.5	1	11.6		9.3		1.8	4	79.1
Leopoldstadt	42.7	2	24.1	1	17.5	1	7.0		5.9		2.8	4	73.2
Landstraße	40.5	2	23.5	1	15.7		10.2		7.8		2.3	3	75.7
Favoriten	41.4	4	39.3	4	6.3		6.1		3.6		3.2	8	70.3
Simmering	40.3	2	42.9	3	5.2		5.1		3.7		2.9	5	72.5
Meidling	41.5	2	32.1	1	10.7		7.9		5.1		2.6	3	70.6
Hietzing	32.5	1	25.2	1	11.1		20.3		9.7		1.2	2	80.3
Penzing	38.0	2	30.1	1	12.5		11.0		6.6		1.8	3	76.1
Rudolfsheim-Fünfhaus	42.3	1	26.4	1	17.2		6.3		4.7		2.9	2	69.3
Ottakring	40.9	2	28.2	1	14.4		8.2		5.4		1.9	3	73.0
Hernals	37.7	1	25.9	1	15.7		11.0		7.5		2.2	2	74.7
Währing	34.0	1	19.5		18.2		16.7		10.1		1.5	1	79.0
Döbling	35.7	1	25.2	1	10.1		18.0		9.6		1.5	2	77.5
Brigittenau	43.1	2	31.3	1	11.4		5.8		4.6		4.0	3	69.9
Floridsdorf	39.2	4	40.6	4	6.3		6.5		4.1		3.4	8	75.2
Donaustadt	40.8	4	38.6	4	7.2		6.7		4.9		1.8	8	76.8
Liesing	39.6	2	34.3	2	8.2		9.6		6.5		1.8	4	78.8
Remaining seats		6		5		7		7		5		30	
Total	39.6	44	30.8	34	11.8	10	9.2	7	6.2	5	2.4	100	74.7
Source: Viennese Government

== Aftermath ==
In light of the ÖVP's historically poor result, state chairman Manfred Juraczka announced his resignation on election night. He was succeeded by general-secretary Gernot Blümel.

Ahead of the election, Greens top candidate and deputy mayor, Maria Vassilakou, stated she would resign if the Greens did not improve on their 2010 result. However, after suffering a loss of 0.8% in the election, Vassilakou reneged on the pledge, instead seeking to renew the coalition with the SPÖ and secure a second term as deputy mayor. She was subject to criticism from the public and her own party, with fellow Greens deputy Johannes Voggenhuber stating her broken promise demonstrated a "loss of reality" within the party leadership. The day after the election, Vassilakou offered her resignation to the Greens state congress, but it was rejected. She was harshly criticised by SPÖ deputy Peko Baxant, who said, "I really don't know if you can continue to work with such people."

Post-election, Häupl announced he would seek a coalition with the Greens. He also stated that the SPÖ would be open to abolishing the non-executive councillors, but noted they had "a long way to go" due to the two-thirds Landtag majority required to amend the state constitution. Since the FPÖ won over a third of seats, it was entitled to take one of the two deputy mayor positions; this was filled by Johann Gudenus. He remained a non-executive councillor. The SPÖ and Greens finalised a 150-page coalition agreement on 13 November, which was subsequently approved by both parties. The government was sworn in on 24 November.
