= Feurstein =

Feurstein is a surname. Notable people with the surname include:

- Christian Feurstein (1958–2017), Austrian Roman Catholic priest and Cistercian monk
- Gottfried Feurstein (1939–2024), Austrian economist and politician
- Valentin Feurstein (1885–1970), Austrian military officer

== See also ==
- Feuerstein
