= Thomas Spalt =

Austrian politician (born 1985)

Member of the National Council
- Incumbent
- Assumed office 1 November 2022
- Preceded by: Reinhard Eugen Bösch
- Constituency: Vorarlberg (2022–2024); Vorarlberg North (2024–present)

Personal details
- Born: 27 February 1985 (age 41)
- Party: Freedom Party

Thomas Spalt (born 27 February 1985) is an Austrian politician of the Freedom Party. He has been a member of the National Council since 2022, and a city councillor of Feldkirch since 2010.
