= Christoph Metzler =

Christoph Metzler may refer to:

- Christoph Metzler (bishop)
- Christoph Metzler (politician)
