= Reinhard Eugen Bösch =

Austrian politician (born 1957)

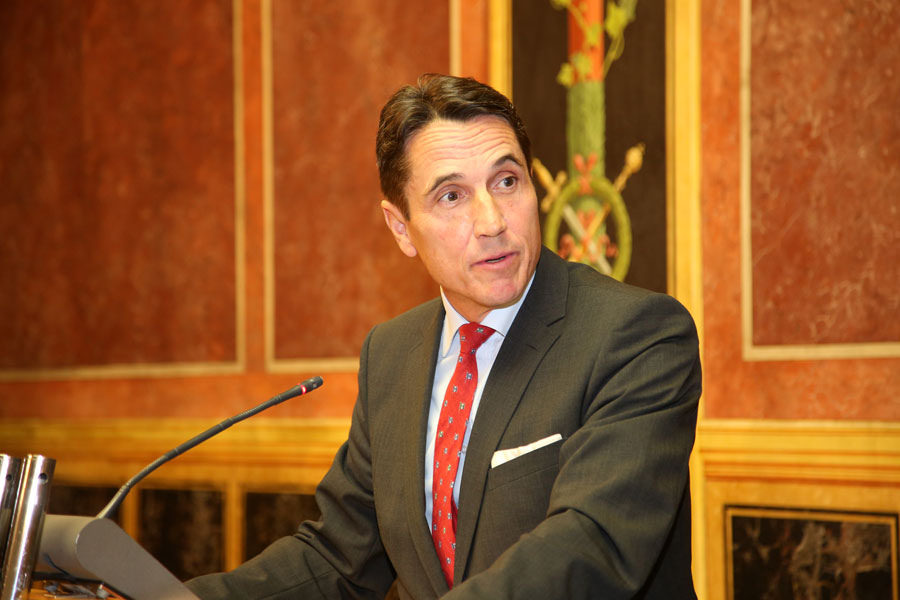

Member of the National Council
- In office 29 October 2013 – 31 October 2022
- Succeeded by: Thomas Spalt
- Constituency: Federal list (2013–2017); Vorarlberg North (2017–2019); Vorarlberg (2019–2022)
- In office 29 October 1999 – 27 October 2008

Personal details
- Born: 16 January 1957 (age 69)
- Party: Freedom Party of Austria

Reinhard Eugen Bösch (born 16 January 1957) is an Austrian politician who was a Member of the National Council for the Freedom Party of Austria (FPÖ). He is a former Member of the Federal Council.
