= Norbert Sieber =

Austrian politician (born 1969)

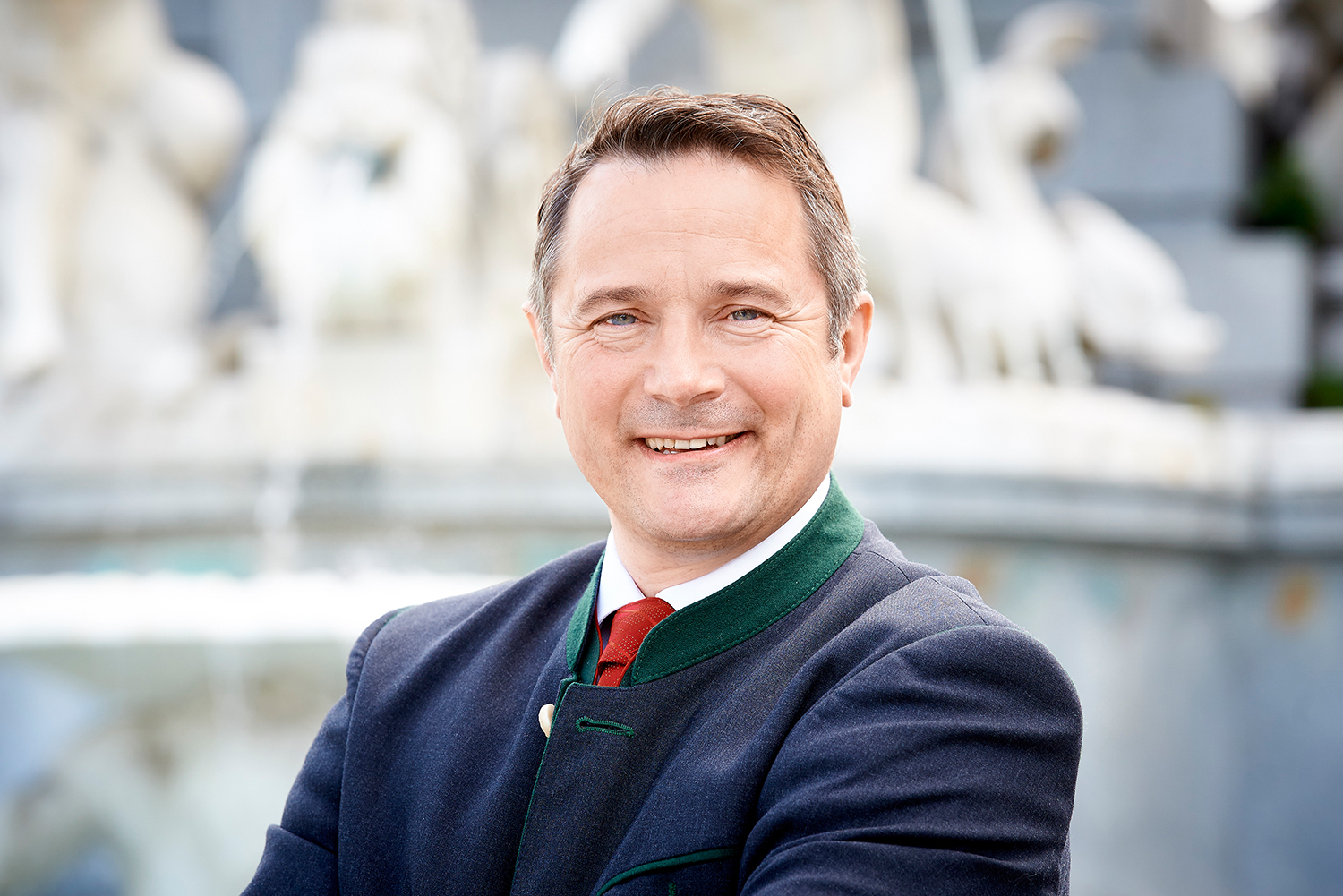
- Sieber in 2016

Member of the National Council
- Incumbent
- Assumed office 17 December 2013
- Constituency: Vorarlberg North
- In office 20 December 2002 – 27 October 2008
- Constituency: Vorarlberg

Personal details
- Born: 12 January 1969 (age 57)
- Party: People's Party

Norbert Sieber (born 12 January 1969) is an Austrian politician of the People's Party. He has been a member of the National Council since 2013, having previously served from 2002 to 2008. Since 1999, he has served as chairman of the Bauernbund in the Bregenz District.
