= 2024 Vorarlberg state election =

State election of Vorarlberg, Austria

- 13 October 2024

All 36 seats in the Landtag of Vorarlberg 19 seats needed for a majority
- Turnout: 185,182 (68.1%) ▲6.7pp
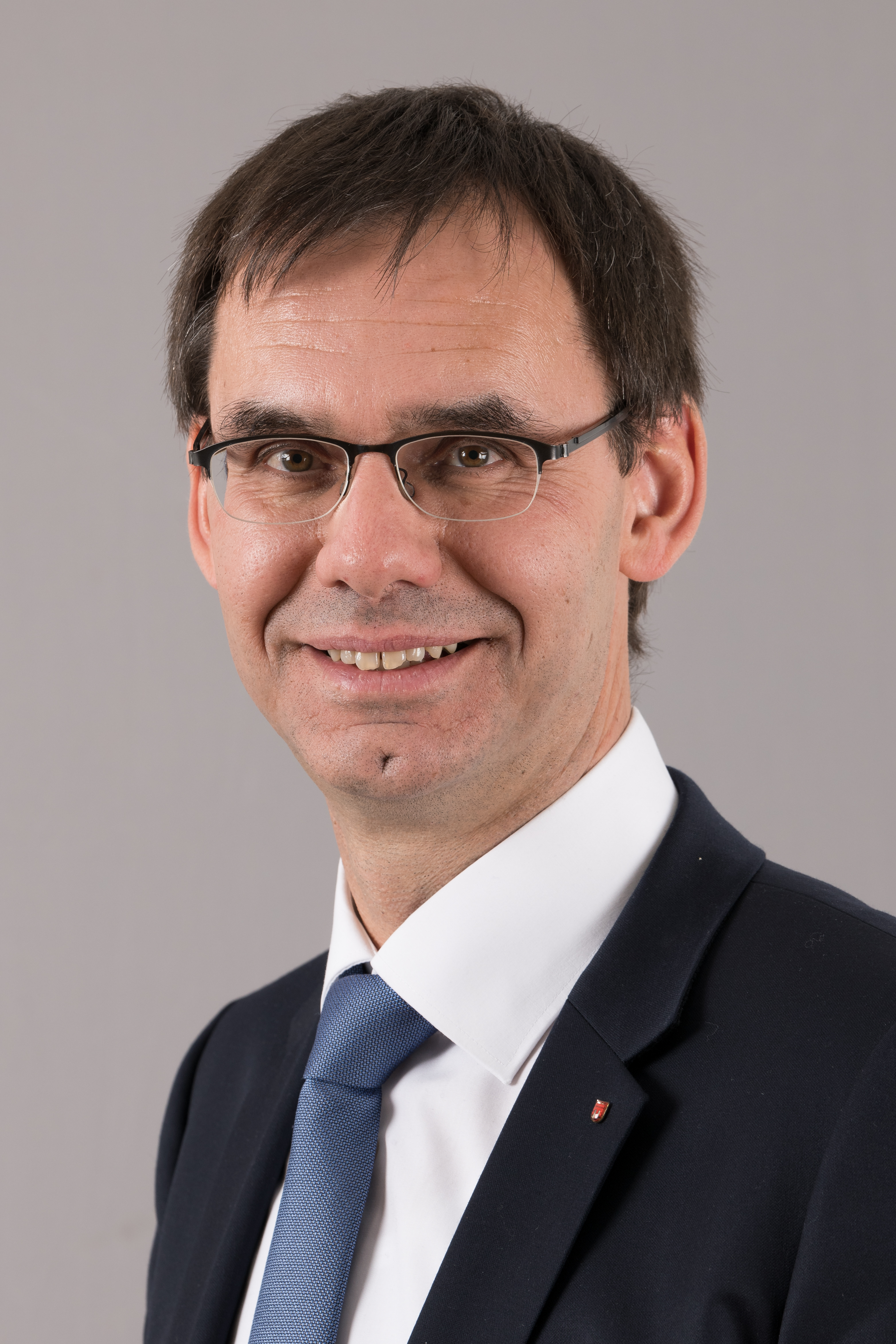

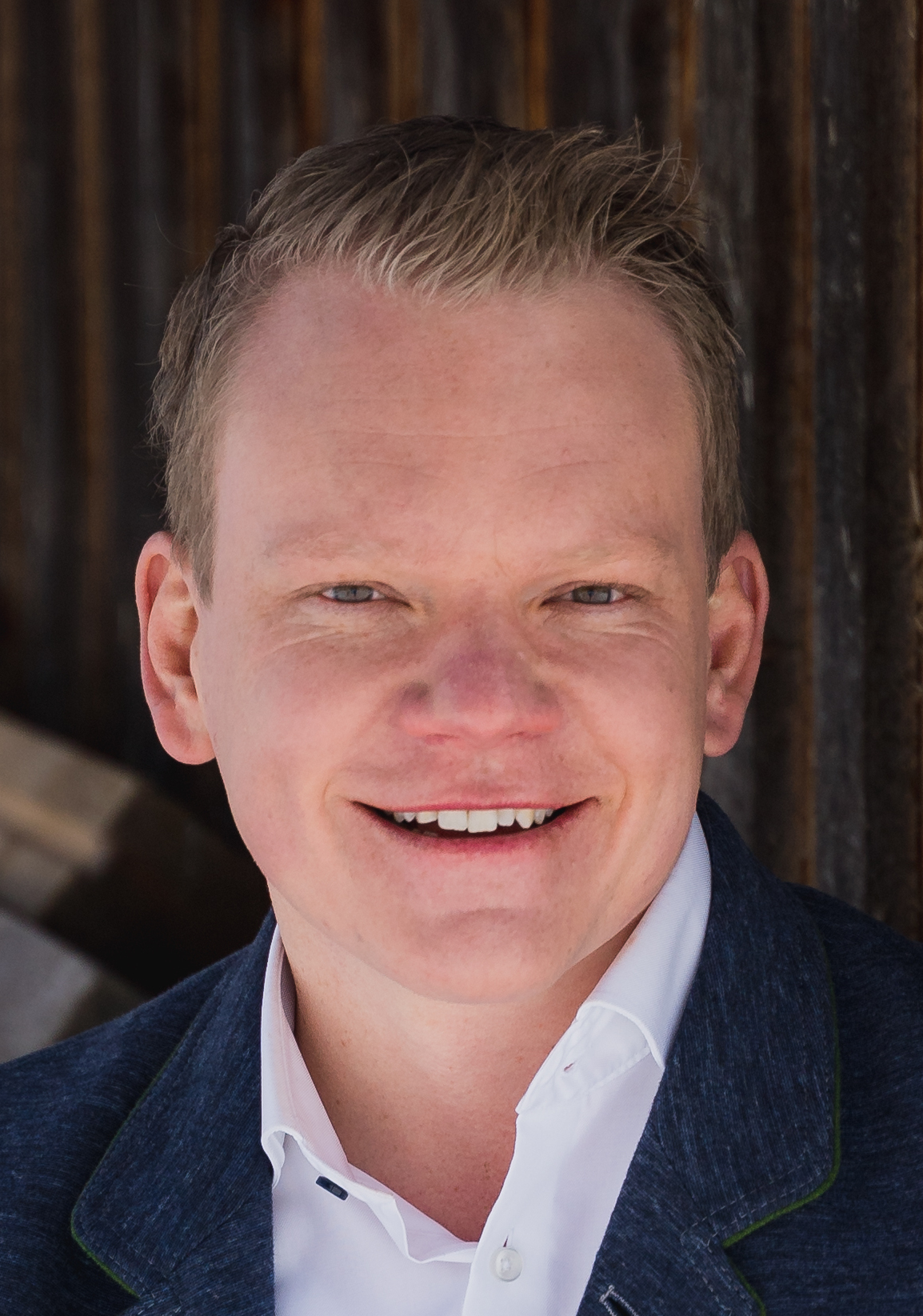

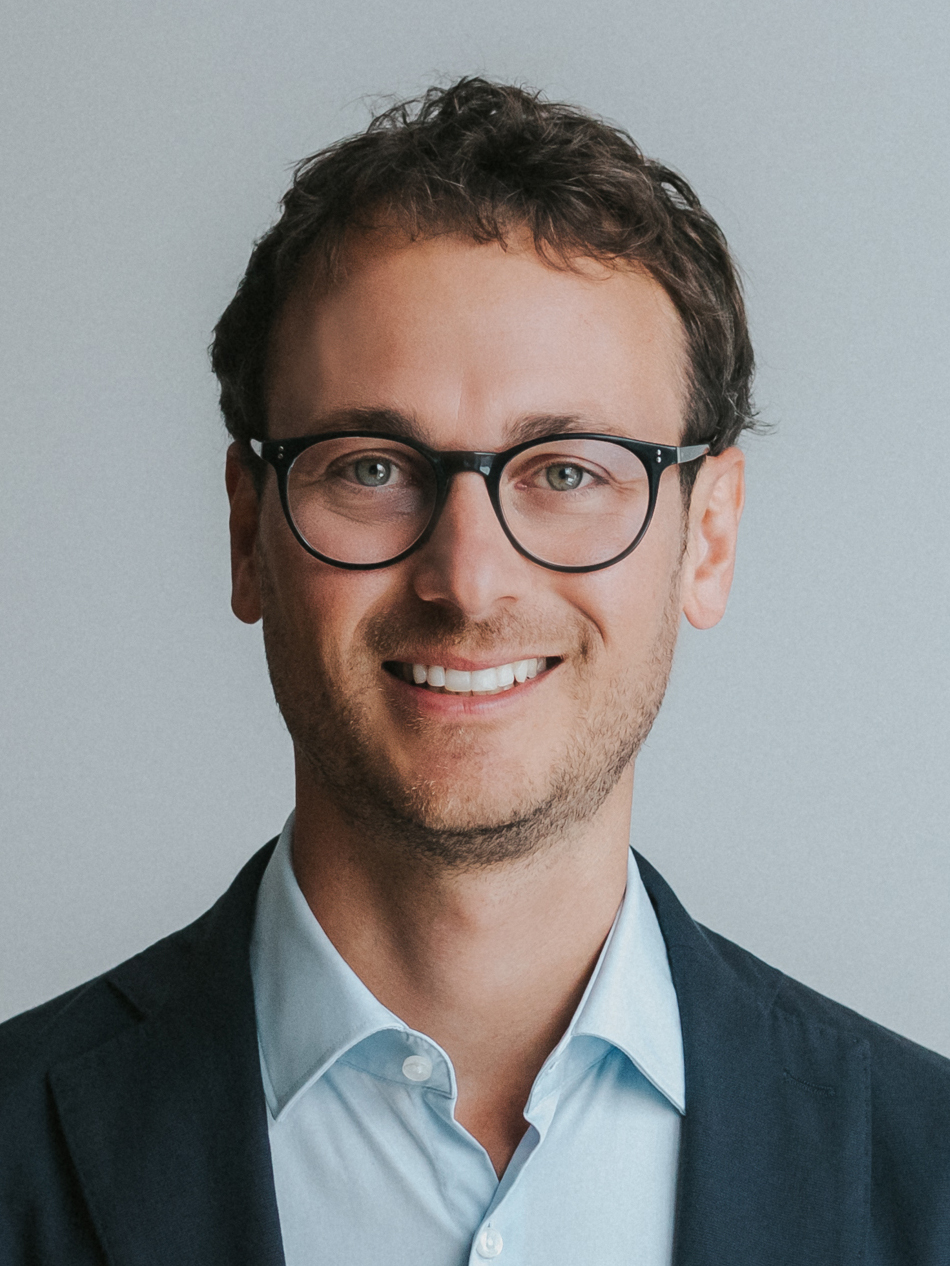

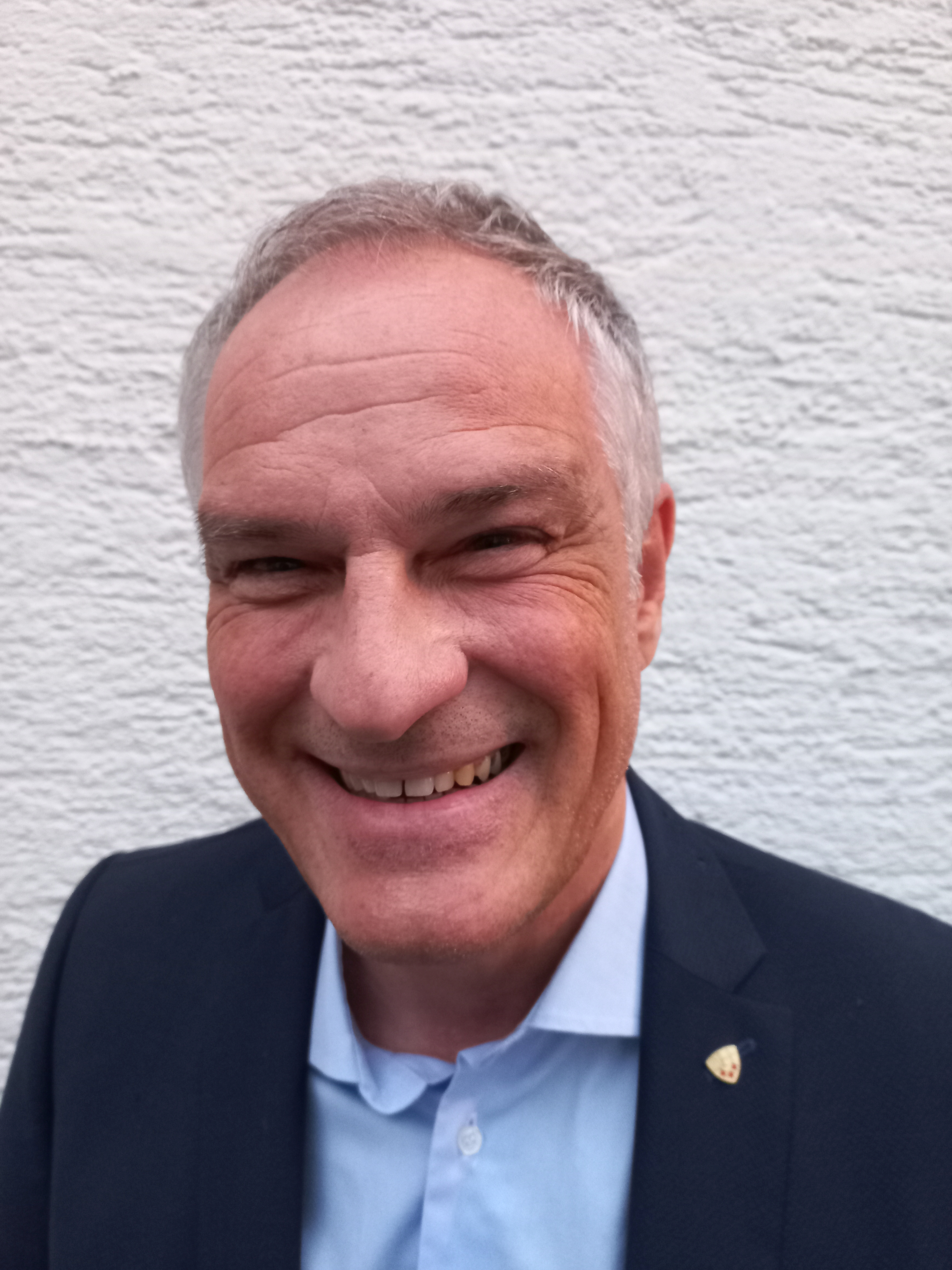

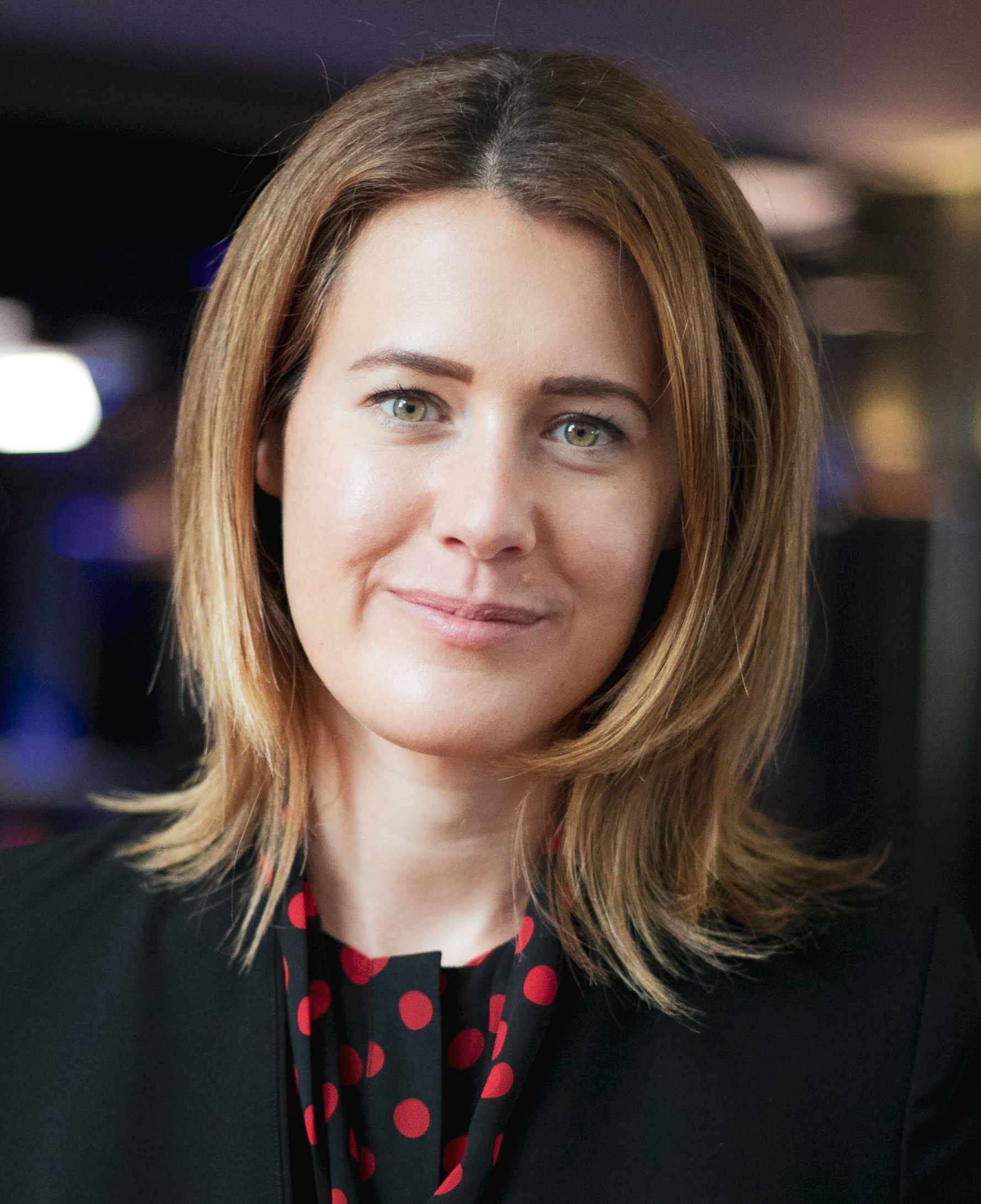
	First party	Second party	Third party
Leader	Markus Wallner	Christof Bitschi	Daniel Zadra
Party	ÖVP	FPÖ	Greens
Last election	17 seats, 43.5%	5 seats, 13.9%	7 seats, 18.9%
Seats won	15	11	4
Seat change	▼2	▲6	▼3
Popular vote	70,638	51,639	22,926
Percentage	38.3%	28.0%	12.4%
Swing	▼5.2pp	▲14.1pp	▼6.5pp
	Fourth party	Fifth party
Leader	Mario Leiter	Claudia Gamon
Party	SPÖ	NEOS
Last election	4 seats, 9.5%	3 seats, 8.5%
Seats won	3	3
Seat change	▼1	0
Popular vote	16,713	16,477
Percentage	9.1%	8.9%
Swing	▼0.4pp	▲0.4pp
- ÖVP (black) and FPÖ (blue) results by municipality. Darker shades indicate a stronger vote share.
Governor before election
Markus Wallner
ÖVP
Elected Governor
Markus Wallner
ÖVP

The Vorarlberg state election of 2024 was held in the Austrian state of Vorarlberg on 13 October 2024.

== Background ==
In the 2019 state election, the ÖVP was the strongest party with 43.5% of the vote, but fell short of the absolute mandate majority. With 18.9%, the Greens achieved their best election result to date in a Vorarlberg state election and became the second strongest party for the first time. The FPÖ was the only party to suffer losses and fell to third place with 13.9%. The SPÖ was able to recover minimally, reaching 9.5%, while NEOS obtained 8.5% of the vote. The small parties "Home to all Cultures" (HAK) and "Xi – Future Opportunity" were able to obtain results above 1%, but ultimately failed to reach the 5% threshold to enter parliament.

The ÖVP decided to continue the previous coalition with the Greens after negotiations that lasted less than two weeks. In the constituent session of the Landtag on 13 October 2019, the state government under Governor Markus Wallner (ÖVP) was sworn in.

== Contesting parties ==
=== Parties already in the Landtag ===
No.	Logo	Name	Shortform	Leader
1		Governor Markus Wallner – Vorarlberg People's Party	VP	Markus Wallner
2		The Greens – The Green Alternative Vorarlberg	GRÜNE	Daniel Zadra
3		List Christof Bitschi – Freedom Party Vorarlberg	FPÖ	Christof Bitschi
4		Mario Leiter – Social Democratic Party Vorarlberg	SPÖ	Mario Leiter
5		NEOS – The New Vorarlberg	NEOS	Claudia Gamon

=== Parties not in the Landtag ===
For a party to contest in the election, they have to enter at least on list in one of the four districts of Vorarlberg. To be able to do so, they need 100 validated signatures per district. The deadline for entering was 23 August 2024 at 5pm CEST.

The following parties have fulfilled the requirements and will appear on the ballot:

No.	Logo	Name	Shortform	Leader	Ideology
6		Xi – HaK – G!LT (Note: Electoral alliance between Xi – Future Opportunity, Home to all Cultures and My Vote Counts!)	X	Chris Alge	Big tent: Environmentalism (Xi); Multiculturalism (HaK); Anti-establishment (G!LT)
7		We - Platform for Families and Child protection	WIR	Christoph Alton	Familialism; Social conservatism
8		Communist Party of Austria	KPÖ	Sascha Kulasevic	Communism; Socialism
9		The other Vorarlberg	ANDRS	Bernhard Amann	Eco-socialism

=== Non-contesting parties ===
A participation of the following parties have been speculated, yet they declined and did not enter the election:

- BIER Partei (Beer Party)
- MFG Austria – People Freedom Fundamental Rights
- Der Wandel (The Change)

== Opinion polling ==
Polling firm	Fieldwork date	Sample size	ÖVP	Grüne	FPÖ	SPÖ	NEOS	Others	Lead
2024 state election	13 Oct 2024	–	38.3	12.3	28.0	9.1	8.8	3.2	10.2
Spectra/VN	14–29 Aug 2024	501	31	18	28	12	10	2	3
Peter Hajek/NEOS Vorarlberg	Dec 2023	–	30	14	29	12	10	3	1
Berndt/FPÖ Vorarlberg	Nov 2023	702	33	13	27	13	10	5	6
Berndt/FPÖ Vorarlberg	17 Oct–3 Nov 2022	503	29	14	20	13	12	12	9
Gallup/VN	21 May 2022 (Note: Date of publication of poll; fieldwork date unknown.)	500	32	15	17	12	11	13	15
Gallup/VN	23 Mar–10 Apr 2022	500	36	14	16	12	11	11	20
Berndt/VN	12–15 Oct 2021	503	36	15	16	9	10	14	20
2019 state election	13 Oct 2019	–	43.5	18.9	13.9	9.5	8.5	5.7	17.8

== Result ==
Party	Votes	%	+/−	Seats	+/−
Austrian People's Party (ÖVP)	70,638	38.3	–5.2	15	–2
Freedom Party of Austria (FPÖ)	51,639	28.0	+14.1	11	+6
The Greens – The Green Alternative (GRÜNE)	22,926	12.4	–6.5	4	–3
Social Democratic Party of Austria (SPÖ)	16,713	9.1	–0.4	3	–1
NEOS – The New Austria (NEOS)	16,477	8.9	+0.4	3	±0
Xi – HaK – G!LT (X)	2,249	1.2	New	0	New
WIR – Platform for Families and Child Protection (WIR)	1,459	0.8	+0.1	0	±0
Communist Party of Austria (KPÖ)	1.385	0.8	New	0	New
The other Vorarlberg (ANDRS)	934	0.5	New	0	New
Invalid/blank votes	762	0.4	–	–	–
Total	185,182	100	–	36	0
Registered voters/turnout	271,882	68.1	+6.7	–	–
Source: Vorarlberg Government

Popular vote
ÖVP	38.3%
FPÖ	28.0%
GRÜNE	12.4%
SPÖ	9.1%
NEOS	8.9%
Other	3.3%

Landtag seats
ÖVP	41.67%
FPÖ	30.56%
GRÜNE	11.11%
SPÖ	8.33%
NEOS	8.33%

=== Results by constituency ===
Constituency	ÖVP		FPÖ		GRÜNE		SPÖ		NEOS		Others	Total seats
Constituency	%	S	%	S	%	S	%	S	%	S	%	Total seats
Bludenz	41.8		29.8		8.5		10.4		7.2		2.2	
Bregenz	40.6		26.1		12.2		8.6		9.2		3.1	
Dornbirn	32.2		29.9		14.4		9.9		9.7		4.0	
Feldkirch	37.9		27.8		13.7		8.2		9.1		3.5	
Remaining seats												
Total	38.3	15	28.0	11	12.4	4	9.1	3	8.9	3	3.3	36
Source: Vorarlberg Government

== Aftermath ==
=== Government formation ===
On 16 October, Governor Wallner (ÖVP) announced exploration talks with the FPÖ. He wanted quick coalition talks – with a conclusion in early November – so that the new ÖVP-FPÖ government could be sworn in when the new Landtag convened on 6 November.

The ÖVP and FPÖ formed a governing coalition, which was sworn in on 6 November. Wallner was sworn in as governor on 11 November.
