= Vorarlberg North (National Council electoral district) =

Parliamentary electoral district in Austria

- Vorarlberg Nord
- Electoral District for the National Council
- Location of Vorarlberg North within Austria
- District: List: Bregenz; Dornbirn
- State: Vorarlberg
- Population: 231,291 (2024)
- Electorate: 153,030 (2019)
- Area: 1,036 km^{2} (2023)

Current Electoral District
- Created: 1994
- Seats: 4 (1994–present)
- Members: Norbert Sieber (ÖVP)

Vorarlberg North (German: Vorarlberg Nord), also known as Electoral District 8A (German: Wahlkreis 8A), is one of the 39 multi-member regional electoral districts of the National Council, the lower house of the Austrian Parliament, the national legislature of Austria. The electoral district was created in 1992 when electoral regulations were amended to add regional electoral districts to the existing state-wide electoral districts and came into being at the following legislative election in 1994. It consists of the districts of Bregenz and Dornbirn in the state of Vorarlberg. The electoral district currently elects four of the 183 members of the National Council using the open party-list proportional representation electoral system. At the 2019 legislative election the constituency had 153,030 registered electors.

== History ==
Vorarlberg North was one 43 regional electoral districts (regionalwahlkreise) established by the "National Council Electoral Regulations 1992" (Nationalrats-Wahlordnung 1992) passed by the National Council in 1992. It consisted of the districts of Bregenz and Dornbirn in the state of Vorarlberg. The district was initially allocated four seats in May 1993.

== Electoral system ==
Vorarlberg North currently elects four of the 183 members of the National Council using the open party-list proportional representation electoral system. The allocation of seats is carried out in three stages. In the first stage, seats are allocated to parties (lists) at the regional level using a state-wide Hare quota (wahlzahl) (valid votes in the state divided by the number of seats in the state). In the second stage, seats are allocated to parties at the state/provincial level using the state-wide Hare quota (any seats won by the party at the regional stage are subtracted from the party's state seats). In the third and final stage, seats are allocated to parties at the federal/national level using the D'Hondt method (any seats won by the party at the regional and state stages are subtracted from the party's federal seats). Only parties that reach the 4% national threshold, or have won a seat at the regional stage, compete for seats at the state and federal stages.

Electors may cast one preferential vote for individual candidates at the regional, state and federal levels. Split-ticket voting (panachage), or voting for more than one candidate at each level, is not permitted and will result in the ballot paper being invalidated. At the regional level, candidates must receive preferential votes amounting to at least 14% of the valid votes cast for their party to over-ride the order of the party list (10% and 7% respectively for the state and federal levels). Prior to April 2013 electors could not cast preferential votes at the federal level and the thresholds candidates needed to over-ride the party list order were higher at the regional level (half the Hare quota or 1/6 of the party votes) and state level (Hare quota).

== Election results ==
=== Summary ===
Election	Communists KPÖ+ / KPÖ			Social Democrats SPÖ			Greens GRÜNE			NEOS NEOS / LiF			People's ÖVP			Freedom FPÖ		
Election	Votes	%	Seats	Votes	%	Seats	Votes	%	Seats	Votes	%	Seats	Votes	%	Seats	Votes	%	Seats
2019	455	0.45%	0	13,065	12.83%	0	18,542	18.20%	0	13,539	13.29%	0	38,284	37.58%	1	14,742	14.47%	0
2017	682	0.63%	0	18,711	17.26%	0	7,707	7.11%	0	9,556	8.82%	0	38,934	35.92%	1	25,908	23.91%	1
2013	459	0.47%	0	12,095	12.47%	0	16,265	16.77%	0	12,211	12.59%	0	26,935	27.77%	1	19,873	20.49%	0
2008	502	0.49%	0	13,616	13.27%	0	17,272	16.84%	0	2,776	2.71%	0	33,783	32.93%	1	16,464	16.05%	0
2006	489	0.51%	0	16,567	17.20%	0	15,912	16.52%	0				41,912	43.51%	1	11,180	11.61%	0
2002	327	0.30%	0	20,602	18.80%	0	15,877	14.49%	0	1,767	1.61%	0	55,636	50.76%	2	14,252	13.00%	0
1999	191	0.20%	0	15,696	16.80%	0	9,302	9.96%	0	4,677	5.01%	0	33,932	36.33%	1	28,383	30.39%	1
1995	189	0.19%	0	21,952	21.66%	0	7,255	7.16%	0	7,385	7.29%	0	35,505	35.03%	1	28,134	27.76%	1
1994				17,104	19.44%	0	8,006	9.10%	0	5,928	6.74%	0	34,218	38.89%	1	20,965	23.83%	0

=== Detailed ===
==== 2010s ====
===== 2019 =====
Results of the 2019 legislative election held on 29 September 2019:

Party		Votes per district			Total votes	%	Seats
Party		Bre- genz	Dorn- birn	Voting card	Total votes	%	Seats
Austrian People's Party	ÖVP	25,413	12,797	74	38,284	37.58%	1
The Greens – The Green Alternative	GRÜNE	10,947	7,406	189	18,542	18.20%	0
Freedom Party of Austria	FPÖ	8,683	6,036	23	14,742	14.47%	0
NEOS – The New Austria and Liberal Forum	NEOS	8,057	5,384	98	13,539	13.29%	0
Social Democratic Party of Austria	SPÖ	7,621	5,400	44	13,065	12.83%	0
JETZT	JETZT	1,175	970	17	2,162	2.12%	0
Der Wandel	WANDL	418	274	5	697	0.68%	0
KPÖ Plus	KPÖ+	290	160	5	455	0.45%	0
My Vote Counts!	GILT	229	151	2	382	0.37%	0
Valid Votes		62,833	38,578	457	101,868	100.00%	1
Rejected Votes		476	280	2	758	0.74%	
Total Polled		63,309	38,858	459	102,626	67.06%	
Registered Electors		92,351	60,679		153,030		
Turnout		68.55%	64.04%		67.06%		

The following candidates were elected:

- Personal mandates - Norbert Sieber (ÖVP), 6,105 votes.

===== 2017 =====
Results of the 2017 legislative election held on 15 October 2017:

Party		Votes per district			Total votes	%	Seats
Party		Bre- genz	Dorn- birn	Voting card	Total votes	%	Seats
Austrian People's Party	ÖVP	25,568	13,243	123	38,934	35.92%	1
Freedom Party of Austria	FPÖ	15,103	10,767	38	25,908	23.91%	1
Social Democratic Party of Austria	SPÖ	11,235	7,338	138	18,711	17.26%	0
NEOS – The New Austria and Liberal Forum	NEOS	5,653	3,812	91	9,556	8.82%	0
The Greens – The Green Alternative	GRÜNE	4,488	3,118	101	7,707	7.11%	0
Peter Pilz List	PILZ	1,870	1,288	73	3,231	2.98%	0
New Movement for the Future	NBZ	999	988	1	1,988	1.83%	0
My Vote Counts!	GILT	625	335	14	974	0.90%	0
Communist Party of Austria	KPÖ	395	269	18	682	0.63%	0
The Whites	WEIßE	121	102	3	226	0.21%	0
Christian Party of Austria	CPÖ	119	66	1	186	0.17%	0
Free List Austria	FLÖ	101	62	0	163	0.15%	0
Men's Party	M	69	43	1	113	0.10%	0
Valid Votes		66,346	41,431	602	108,379	100.00%	2
Rejected Votes		420	221	4	645	0.59%	
Total Polled		66,766	41,652	606	109,024	71.59%	
Registered Electors		92,113	60,182		152,295		
Turnout		72.48%	69.21%		71.59%		

The following candidates were elected:

- Personal mandates - Reinhard Eugen Bösch (FPÖ), 3,856 votes; and Norbert Sieber (ÖVP), 5,537 votes.

===== 2013 =====
Results of the 2013 legislative election held on 29 September 2013:

Party		Votes per district			Total votes	%	Seats
Party		Bre- genz	Dorn- birn	Voting card	Total votes	%	Seats
Austrian People's Party	ÖVP	18,414	8,456	65	26,935	27.77%	1
Freedom Party of Austria	FPÖ	11,690	8,163	20	19,873	20.49%	0
The Greens – The Green Alternative	GRÜNE	9,560	6,550	155	16,265	16.77%	0
NEOS – The New Austria	NEOS	6,940	5,197	74	12,211	12.59%	0
Social Democratic Party of Austria	SPÖ	7,343	4,725	27	12,095	12.47%	0
Team Stronach	FRANK	3,163	1,989	9	5,161	5.32%	0
Alliance for the Future of Austria	BZÖ	1,318	854	6	2,178	2.25%	0
Pirate Party of Austria	PIRAT	431	311	6	748	0.77%	0
Christian Party of Austria	CPÖ	321	249	4	574	0.59%	0
Communist Party of Austria	KPÖ	266	182	11	459	0.47%	0
Men's Party	M	186	90	2	278	0.29%	0
EU Exit Party	EUAUS	146	87	0	233	0.24%	0
Valid Votes		59,778	36,853	379	97,010	100.00%	1
Rejected Votes		693	347	2	1,042	1.06%	
Total Polled		60,471	37,200	381	98,052	65.39%	
Registered Electors		90,785	59,175		149,960		
Turnout		66.61%	62.86%		65.39%		

The following candidates were elected:

- Personal mandates - Norbert Sieber (ÖVP), 5,500 votes.

==== 2000s ====
===== 2008 =====
Results of the 2008 legislative election held on 28 September 2008:

Party		Votes per district			Total votes	%	Seats
Party		Bre- genz	Dorn- birn	Voting card	Total votes	%	Seats
Austrian People's Party	ÖVP	22,746	10,777	260	33,783	32.93%	1
The Greens – The Green Alternative	GRÜNE	9,856	6,940	476	17,272	16.84%	0
Freedom Party of Austria	FPÖ	9,242	7,175	47	16,464	16.05%	0
Social Democratic Party of Austria	SPÖ	8,188	5,353	75	13,616	13.27%	0
Alliance for the Future of Austria	BZÖ	7,754	5,055	44	12,853	12.53%	0
Fritz Dinkhauser List – Citizens' Forum Tyrol	FRITZ	2,045	1,427	21	3,493	3.40%	0
Liberal Forum	LiF	1,604	1,076	96	2,776	2.71%	0
The Christians	DC	890	584	13	1,487	1.45%	0
Communist Party of Austria	KPÖ	309	184	9	502	0.49%	0
Independent Citizens' Initiative Save Austria	RETTÖ	201	143	4	348	0.34%	0
Valid Votes		62,835	38,714	1,045	102,594	100.00%	1
Rejected Votes		817	492	5	1,314	1.26%	
Total Polled		63,652	39,206	1,050	103,908	71.09%	
Registered Electors		89,003	57,153		146,156		
Turnout		71.52%	68.60%		71.09%		

The following candidates were elected:

- Party mandates - Anna Franz (ÖVP), 3,798 votes.

===== 2006 =====
Results of the 2006 legislative election held on 1 October 2006:

Party		Votes per district			Total votes	%	Seats
Party		Bre- genz	Dorn- birn	Voting card	Total votes	%	Seats
Austrian People's Party	ÖVP	26,609	13,214	2,089	41,912	43.51%	1
Social Democratic Party of Austria	SPÖ	9,689	6,222	656	16,567	17.20%	0
The Greens – The Green Alternative	GRÜNE	8,231	5,939	1,742	15,912	16.52%	0
Freedom Party of Austria	FPÖ	5,918	4,976	286	11,180	11.61%	0
Hans-Peter Martin's List	MATIN	3,881	2,770	259	6,910	7.17%	0
Alliance for the Future of Austria	BZÖ	1,743	1,029	78	2,850	2.96%	0
EU Withdrawal – Neutral Free Austria	NFÖ	272	206	20	498	0.52%	0
Communist Party of Austria	KPÖ	321	143	25	489	0.51%	0
Valid Votes		56,664	34,499	5,155	96,318	100.00%	1
Rejected Votes		468	301	32	801	0.82%	
Total Polled		57,132	34,800	5,187	97,119	69.63%	
Registered Electors		84,923	54,553		139,476		
Turnout		67.28%	63.79%		69.63%		

The following candidates were elected:

- Party mandates - Anna Franz (ÖVP), 4,485 votes.

===== 2002 =====
Results of the 2002 legislative election held on 24 November 2002:

Party		Votes per district			Total votes	%	Seats
Party		Bre- genz	Dorn- birn	Voting card	Total votes	%	Seats
Austrian People's Party	ÖVP	34,266	19,189	2,181	55,636	50.76%	2
Social Democratic Party of Austria	SPÖ	11,852	8,188	562	20,602	18.80%	0
The Greens – The Green Alternative	GRÜNE	8,431	5,868	1,578	15,877	14.49%	0
Freedom Party of Austria	FPÖ	7,792	6,147	313	14,252	13.00%	0
Liberal Forum	LiF	996	690	81	1,767	1.61%	0
Christian Voters Community	CWG	572	321	20	913	0.83%	0
Communist Party of Austria	KPÖ	209	113	5	327	0.30%	0
The Democrats		125	98	6	229	0.21%	0
Valid Votes		64,243	40,614	4,746	109,603	100.00%	2
Rejected Votes		736	493	18	1,247	1.12%	
Total Polled		64,979	41,107	4,764	110,850	83.74%	
Registered Electors		81,030	51,338		132,368		
Turnout		80.19%	80.07%		83.74%		

The following candidates were elected:

- Personal mandates - Anna Franz (ÖVP), 9,730 votes.
- Party mandates - Norbert Sieber (ÖVP), 1,688 votes.

==== 1990s ====
===== 1999 =====
Results of the 1999 legislative election held on 3 October 1999:

Party		Votes per district			Total votes	%	Seats
Party		Bre- genz	Dorn- birn	Voting card	Total votes	%	Seats
Austrian People's Party	ÖVP	21,508	10,722	1,702	33,932	36.33%	1
Freedom Party of Austria	FPÖ	15,783	11,693	907	28,383	30.39%	1
Social Democratic Party of Austria	SPÖ	9,144	5,926	626	15,696	16.80%	0
The Greens – The Green Alternative	GRÜNE	4,943	3,415	944	9,302	9.96%	0
Liberal Forum	LiF	2,478	1,632	567	4,677	5.01%	0
The Independents	DU	315	179	20	514	0.55%	0
No to NATO and EU – Neutral Austria Citizens' Initiative	NEIN	268	160	15	443	0.47%	0
Christian Voters Community	CWG	187	76	10	273	0.29%	0
Communist Party of Austria	KPÖ	107	70	14	191	0.20%	0
Valid Votes		54,733	33,873	4,805	93,411	100.00%	2
Rejected Votes		502	275	14	791	0.84%	
Total Polled		55,235	34,148	4,819	94,202	73.59%	
Registered Electors		78,638	49,367		128,005		
Turnout		70.24%	69.17%		73.59%		

The following candidates were elected:

- Personal mandates - Gottfried Feurstein (ÖVP), 9,638 votes.
- Party mandates - Reinhard Eugen Bösch (FPÖ), 1,170 votes.

===== 1995 =====
Results of the 1995 legislative election held on 17 December 1995:

Party		Votes per district			Total votes	%	Seats
Party		Bre- genz	Dorn- birn	Voting card	Total votes	%	Seats
Austrian People's Party	ÖVP	22,605	11,707	1,193	35,505	35.03%	1
Freedom Party of Austria	FPÖ	16,092	11,606	436	28,134	27.76%	1
Social Democratic Party of Austria	SPÖ	12,755	8,572	625	21,952	21.66%	0
Liberal Forum	LiF	4,036	2,710	639	7,385	7.29%	0
The Greens – The Green Alternative	GRÜNE	3,836	2,701	718	7,255	7.16%	0
No – Civic Action Group; Against the Sale of Austria	NEIN	601	320	12	933	0.92%	0
Communist Party of Austria	KPÖ	98	84	7	189	0.19%	0
Valid Votes		60,023	37,700	3,630	101,353	100.00%	2
Rejected Votes		1,059	592	19	1,670	1.62%	
Total Polled		61,082	38,292	3,649	103,023	83.08%	
Registered Electors		76,252	47,750		124,002		
Turnout		80.11%	80.19%		83.08%		

The following candidates were elected:

- Personal mandates - Gottfried Feurstein (ÖVP), 6,511 votes.
- Party mandates - Ewald Stadler (FPÖ), 2,428 votes.

Substitutions:

- Ewald Stadler (FPÖ) resigned on 28 April 1999 and was replaced by Wolfgang Nußbaumer (FPÖ) on 6 May 1999.

===== 1994 =====
Results of the 1994 legislative election held on 9 October 1994:

Party		Votes per district			Total votes	%	Seats
Party		Bre- genz	Dorn- birn	Voting card	Total votes	%	Seats
Austrian People's Party	ÖVP	21,542	11,182	1,494	34,218	38.89%	1
Freedom Party of Austria	FPÖ	11,312	9,066	587	20,965	23.83%	0
Social Democratic Party of Austria	SPÖ	9,960	6,593	551	17,104	19.44%	0
The Greens – The Green Alternative	GRÜNE	4,162	2,844	1,000	8,006	9.10%	0
Liberal Forum	LiF	3,154	2,128	646	5,928	6.74%	0
Christian Voters Community	CWG	414	183	13	610	0.69%	0
Fritz Georg		257	105	18	380	0.43%	0
No – Civic Action Group; Against the Sale of Austria	NEIN	236	97	12	345	0.39%	0
Natural Law Party	ÖNP	112	70	12	194	0.22%	0
Citizen Greens Austria – Free Democrats	BGÖ	48	69	12	129	0.15%	0
United Greens Austria – List Adi Pinter	VGÖ	56	47	2	105	0.12%	0
Valid Votes		51,253	32,384	4,347	87,984	100.00%	1
Rejected Votes		568	329	22	919	1.03%	
Total Polled		51,821	32,713	4,369	88,903	72.01%	
Registered Electors		75,855	47,605		123,460		
Turnout		68.32%	68.72%		72.01%		

The following candidates were elected:

- Personal mandates - Gottfried Feurstein (ÖVP), 9,891 votes.
