= Men's Party =

Men's Party Männerpartei
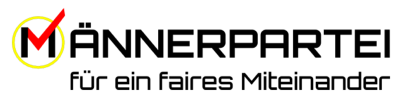
- Abbreviation: M
- Chairman: Hannes Hausbichler
- Founded: 2008
- Headquarters: Vienna
- Ideology: Men's rights
- National Council: 0 / 183
- Federal Council: 0 / 61
- European Parliament: 0 / 18

Website
- www.maennerpartei.at

Men's Party (German: Männerpartei), abbreviated as M, is a minor political party in Austria, which campaigns for "equal opportunities and equal treatment" of men before the law.

== History ==
The Men's Party was founded in 2008 by Oliver Peter Hoffmann and has been active in the public sphere since 2009. The first focus of its political work was on "equal rights for fathers". The Men's Party organized panel discussions, demonstrations and media work on this topic.

In the 2010 Vienna elections, the party ran as part of the Direct Democracy Platform (DEM), an electoral alliance of five groups. DEM was only in Donaustadt on the ballot and received in the End only 331 votes (0.04%).

In the 2013 National Council elections, the Men's Party ran in the State of Vorarlberg and received 488 votes, which corresponded to 0.28% of the valid votes in Vorarlberg and 0.01% in Austria.

In 2014, the party gained enough signatures to run in the 2014 Vorarlberg state elections. They achieved 0.39% (672 votes) and no seats.

In the 2015 state elections in Vienna, the party ran again in the district of Donaustadt and achieved 0.17% (152 votes) there (total in Vienna: 0.02%).

The party contested the 2017 National Council elections in Vorarlberg, but missed out on a seat in the National Council by a clear margin with only 221 votes (0.00% total in Austria).

The party achieved 567 votes (0.34%) in its last appearance in an election in October 2019 in the Vorarlberg state election.

== Election results ==
=== National Council ===
National Council of Austria
Election year	# of total votes	% of overall vote	# of seats	Government
2013	488	0.01%	0 / 183	Extra-parliamentary
2017	221	0.01%	0 / 183	Extra-parliamentary

=== State Parliaments ===
State	Year	Votes	%	Seats	±	Government
Vienna	2010	331	0.04 (#9)	0 / 100	N/A	Extra-parliamentary
Vorarlberg	2014	672	0.39 (#9)	0 / 36	N/A	Extra-parliamentary
Vienna	2015	152	0.02 (#10)	0 / 100	N/A	Extra-parliamentary
Vorarlberg	2019	567	0.34 (#10)	0 / 36	N/A	Extra-parliamentary
