= Hans-Peter Bischof =

Austrian physician and politician

Hans-Peter Bischof (born 21 January 1947, Götzis, Austria) is an Austrian medical doctor and former politician in the federal state of Vorarlberg for the Austrian People's Party (ÖVP). From 1997 to 1999, and from 2004 to 2006, he was the governor of Vorarlberg Federal State Department.

== Education and profession ==
Bischof was born on 21 January 1947, the son of the municipal physician of Götzis, Leopold Bischof and his wife Herta in Götzis. Hans-Peter Bischof attended volksschule in Götzis and Gymnasium in Feldkirch before he moved to the Collegium Bernardi, a Catholic private gymnasium in the Territorial Abbey of Wettingen-Mehrerau near Bregenz, where he maturated in 1966. After completing compulsory military service in the Austrian Armed Forces in the Sanitätsstruppenschule at Vienna, he began his medical studies at the University of Innsbruck in 1967, where he graduated in 1975 with a doctorate in human medicine. On 22 December 1975, Bischof married pediatrician Brigitte Dörler.

After several years of professional experience, he gained, in 1983 the, completion of residency training in internal medicine and was senior physician of the intensive care unit at the regional hospital in Bregenz. In 1989, he became a specialist in cardiology. From 1991 onwards, he was head of the intensive care unit of the hospital, and in 2008, he retired. Since November 11, 2008 he is honorary president of the association Institute for Social Services (IfS).

== Political career ==
Bischof, a member of the ÖAAB until 1992, and since then, the Austrian People's Party (ÖVP), was, in 1993 for the first time, in the Vorarlberg state government appointed as the Minister for Social Affairs, Health, hospitals and culture. After four years, in 1997, he was selected by the governor of Vorarlberg Federal State to be the Landesstatthalter of Vorarlberg. After that, he was, from 1999 to 2004, he was after on the ballet for state election for the ÖVP in the state governor election in September of the same year, and won an absolute majority in parliament, reappointed as governor, a position he held until the year of 2006.

In September 2006, Bischof suffered a severe cerebral haemorrhage, which eventually led him to resign from his political offices on 13 December 2006. His successor as a Landesstaltthalter was future governor of Vorarlberg federal state Markus Wallner.
