= Wien anders =

- Founded: 2015
- Headquarters: 1170 Wien, Schadinagasse 3
- Ideology: Progressivism; Egalitarianism
- Political position: Left-wing

Website
- wienanders.at

Wien anders (ANDAS) is a political alliance in Vienna, Austria, created for the city's 2015 parliamentary and local elections. It consists of several parties, most notably the Communist Party of Austria and the Pirate Party of Austria.
