= 2014 Vorarlberg state election =

State election in Austria

← 2009	21 September 2014	2019 →

All 36 seats in the Landtag of Vorarlberg 19 seats needed for a majority
- Turnout: 171,765 (64.3%) ▼4.1%
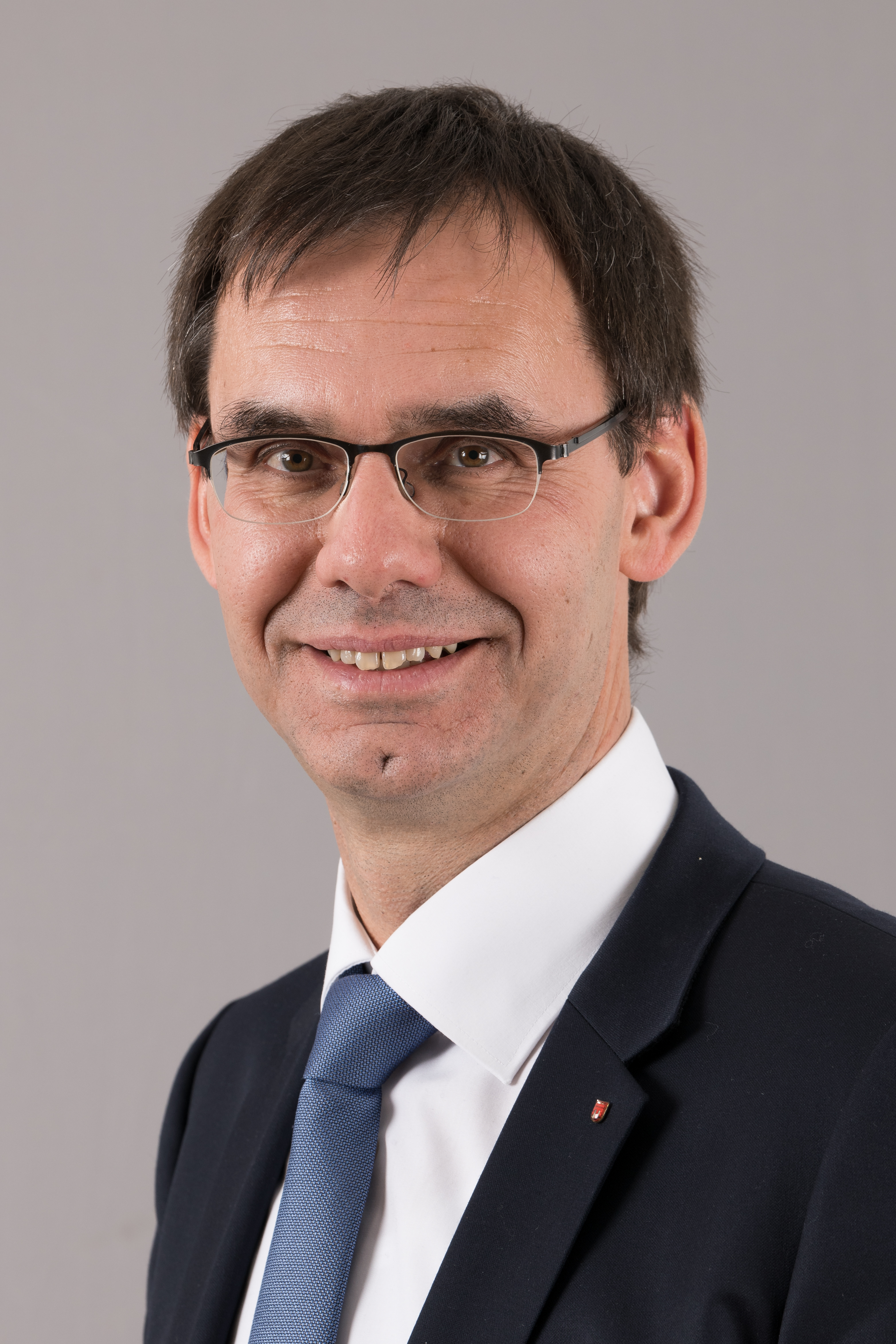

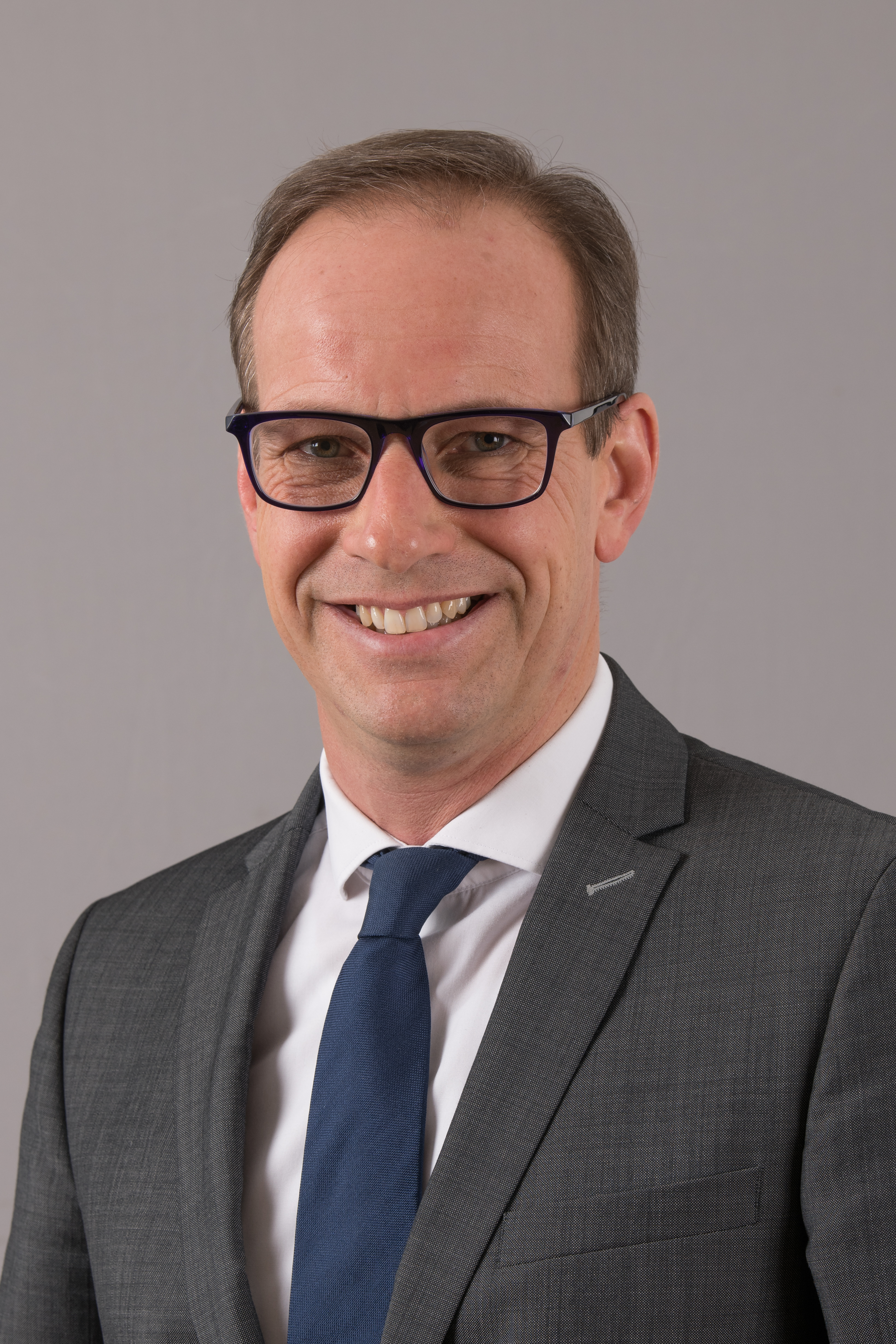

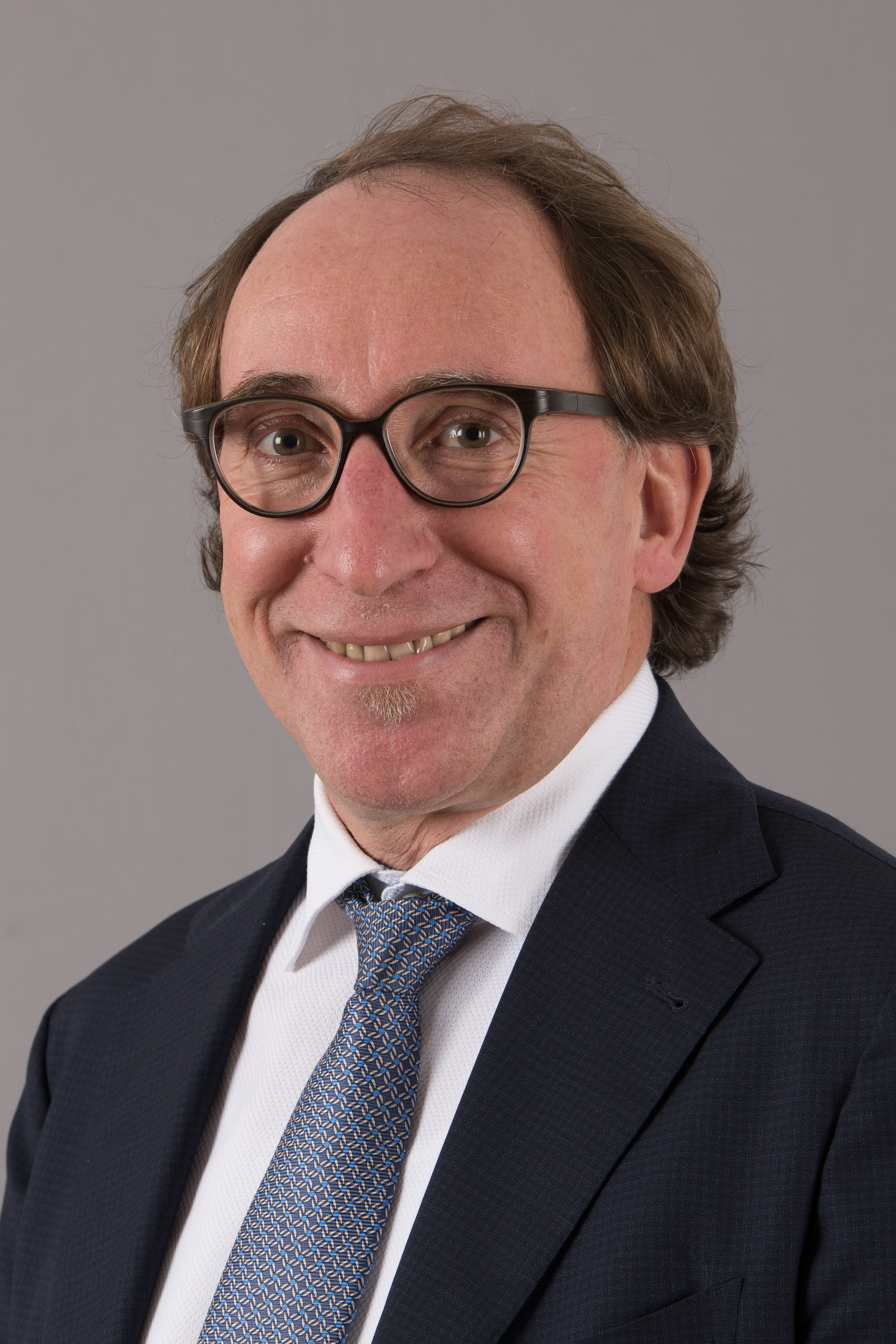

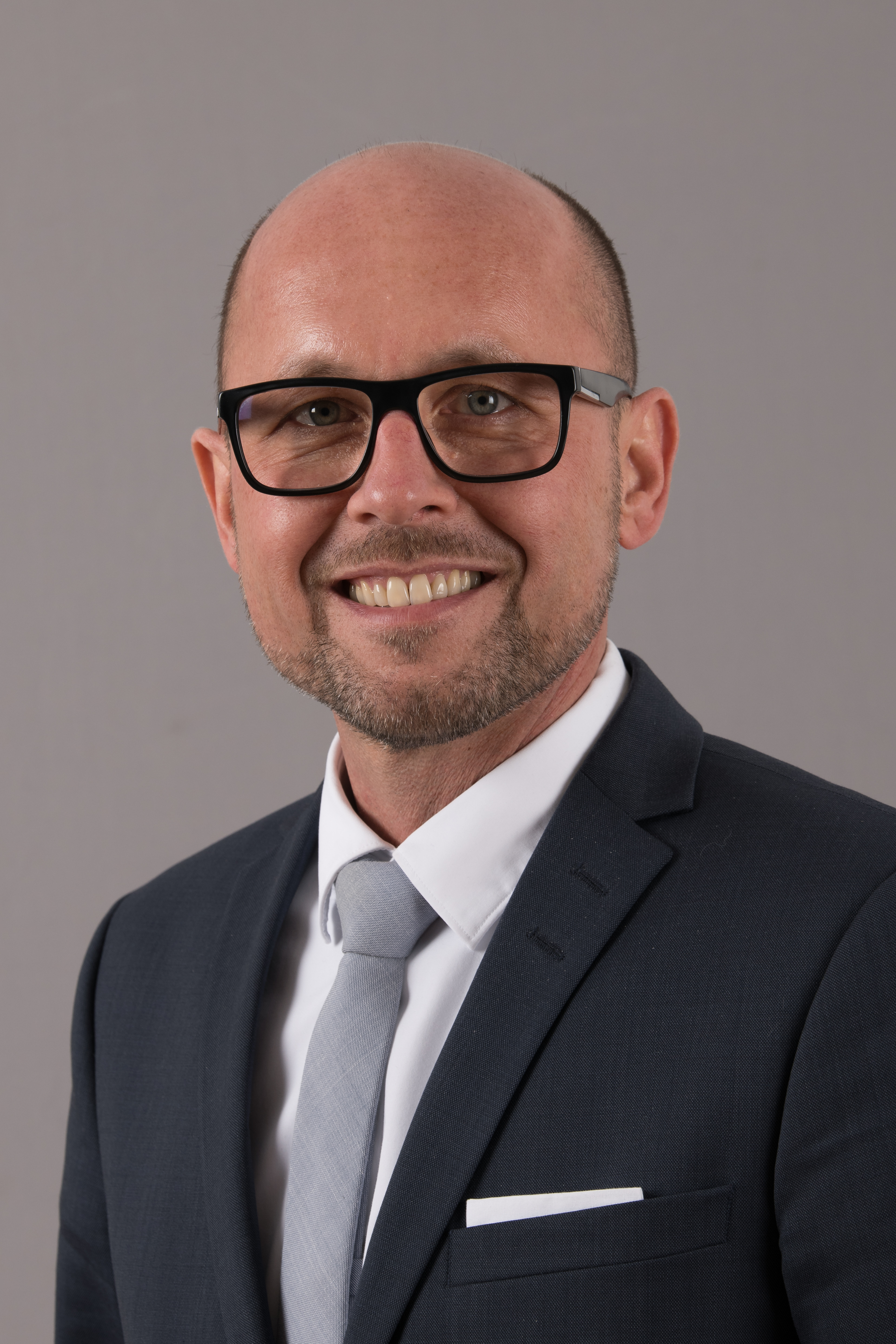

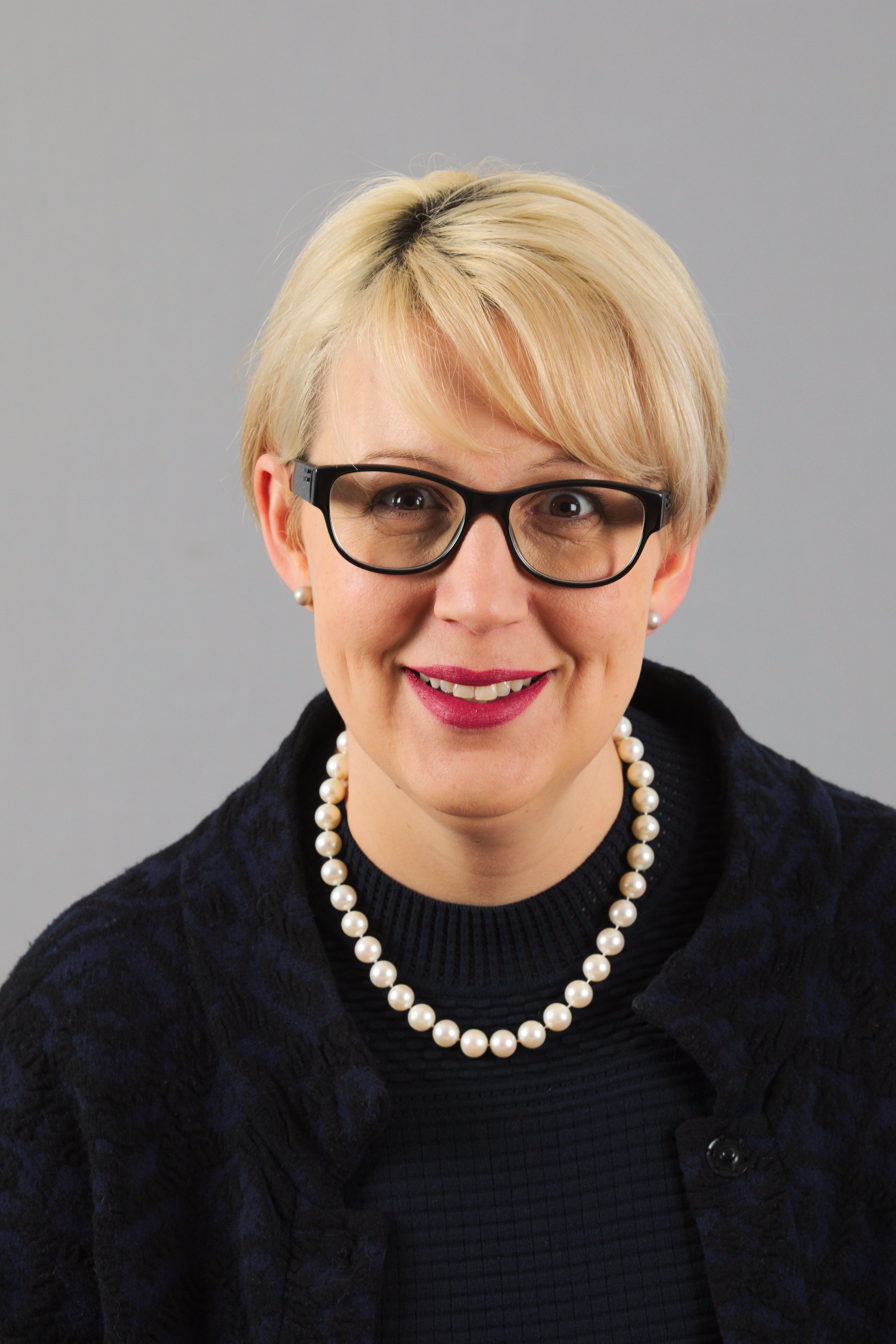
	First party	Second party	Third party
Leader	Markus Wallner	Dieter Egger	Johannes Rauch
Party	ÖVP	FPÖ	Greens
Last election	20 seats, 50.8%	9 seats, 25.1%	4 seats, 10.6%
Seats won	16	9	6
Seat change	▼4	0	▲2
Popular vote	71,205	39,892	29,193
Percentage	41.8%	23.4%	17.1%
Swing	▼9.0%	▼1.7%	▲6.5%
	Fourth party	Fifth party
Leader	Michael Ritsch	Sabine Scheffknecht
Party	SPÖ	NEOS
Last election	3 seats, 10.0%	Did not exist
Seats won	3	2
Seat change	0	▲2
Popular vote	14,948	11,742
Percentage	8.8%	6.9%
Swing	▼1.2%	New party
- ÖVP (black) and FPÖ (blue) results by municipality. Darker shades indicate a stronger vote share.
Governor before election
Markus Wallner
ÖVP
Elected Governor
Markus Wallner
ÖVP

The 2014 Vorarlberg state election was held on 21 September 2014 to elect the members of the Landtag of Vorarlberg.

The Austrian People's Party (ÖVP) suffered substantial losses, and was deprived of its majority in the Landtag. The second-placed Freedom Party of Austria (FPÖ) and Social Democratic Party of Austria (SPÖ) retained their position with minor losses. The beneficiaries of the ÖVP's defeat were The Greens, who achieved a breakthrough result of 17.1%, and NEOS – The New Austria, which debuted at 6.9%.

Now lacking a majority, the ÖVP led by Governor Markus Wallner sought a coalition partner. They ultimately formed government with the Greens.

== Background ==
In the 2009 election, the ÖVP saw a small downswing but retained its majority. The FPÖ double its share of the vote and became the second largest party, ahead of the SPÖ.

== Electoral system ==
The 36 seats of the Landtag of Vorarlberg are elected via open list proportional representation in a two-step process. The seats are distributed between four multi-member constituencies, corresponding to the districts of Vorarlberg. For parties to receive any representation in the Landtag, they must either win at least one seat in a constituency directly, or clear a 5 percent state-wide electoral threshold. Seats are distributed in constituencies according to the Hagenbach-Bischoff quota, with any remaining seats allocated at the state level, to ensure overall proportionality between a party's vote share and its share of seats.

== Contesting parties ==
The table below lists parties represented in the previous Landtag.

Name		Ideology	Leader	2009 result	
Name		Ideology	Leader	Votes (%)	Seats
ÖVP	Austrian People's Party; Österreichische Volkspartei	Christian democracy	Markus Wallner	50.8%	20 / 36
FPÖ	Freedom Party of Austria; Freiheitliche Partei Österreichs	Right-wing populism Euroscepticism	Dieter Egger	25.1%	9 / 36
GRÜNE	The Greens – The Green Alternative; Die Grünen – Die Grüne Alternative	Green politics	Johannes Rauch	10.6%	4 / 36
SPÖ	Social Democratic Party of Austria; Sozialdemokratische Partei Österreichs	Social democracy	Michael Ritsch	10.0%	3 / 36

In addition to the parties already represented in the Landtag, five parties collected enough signatures to be placed on the ballot.

- NEOS – The New Austria (NEOS)
- WIR – Platform for Families and Child Protection (WIR)
- Christian Party of Austria (CPÖ)
- Pirate Party of Austria (PIRAT)
- Men's Party (M)

== Result ==
Party	Votes	%	+/−	Seats	+/−
Austrian People's Party (ÖVP)	71,205	41.79	–9.00	16	–4
Freedom Party of Austria (FPÖ)	39,892	23.42	–1.70	9	±0
The Greens – The Green Alternative (GRÜNE)	29,193	17.14	+6.56	6	+2
Social Democratic Party of Austria (SPÖ)	14,948	8.77	–1.25	3	±0
NEOS – The New Austria (NEOS)	11,743	6.89	New	2	New
WIR – Platform for Families and Child Protection (WIR)	1,088	0.64	New	0	New
Christian Party of Austria (CPÖ)	833	0.49	New	0	New
Pirate Party of Austria (PIRAT)	795	0.47	+0.47	0	±0
Men's Party (M)	672	0.39	New	0	New
Invalid/blank votes	1,396	–	–	–	–
Total	171,765	100	–	36	0
Registered voters/turnout	267,104	64.31	–4.13	–	–
Source: Vorarlberg Government

Popular vote
ÖVP	41.79%
FPÖ	23.42%
GRÜNE	17.14%
SPÖ	8.77%
NEOS	6.89%
Other	1.99%

Landtag seats
ÖVP	44.44%
FPÖ	25.00%
GRÜNE	16.67%
SPÖ	8.33%
NEOS	5.56%

=== Results by constituency ===
Constituency	ÖVP		FPÖ		Grüne		SPÖ		NEOS		Others	Total seats
Constituency	%	S	%	S	%	S	%	S	%	S	%	Total seats
Bludenz	45.6	3	22.6	1	12.0		11.0		6.6		2.3	4
Bregenz	43.9	5	22.6	2	16.2	2	9.0	1	6.6		1.7	10
Dornbirn	35.8	3	27.3	2	20.2	1	7.8		7.1		1.8	6
Feldkirch	41.3	4	22.0	2	19.4	2	7.8		8.3		2.3	8
Remaining seats		1		2		1		2		2		8
Total	41.8	16	23.4	9	17.1	6	8.8	3	6.9	2	2.0	36
Source: Vorarlberg Government
