= 2019 Vorarlberg state election =

Election held on 13 October 2019 to elect the members of the Landtag of Vorarlberg

- 13 October 2019

All 36 seats in the Landtag of Vorarlberg 19 seats needed for a majority
- Turnout: 166,130 (61.4%) ▼2.9%
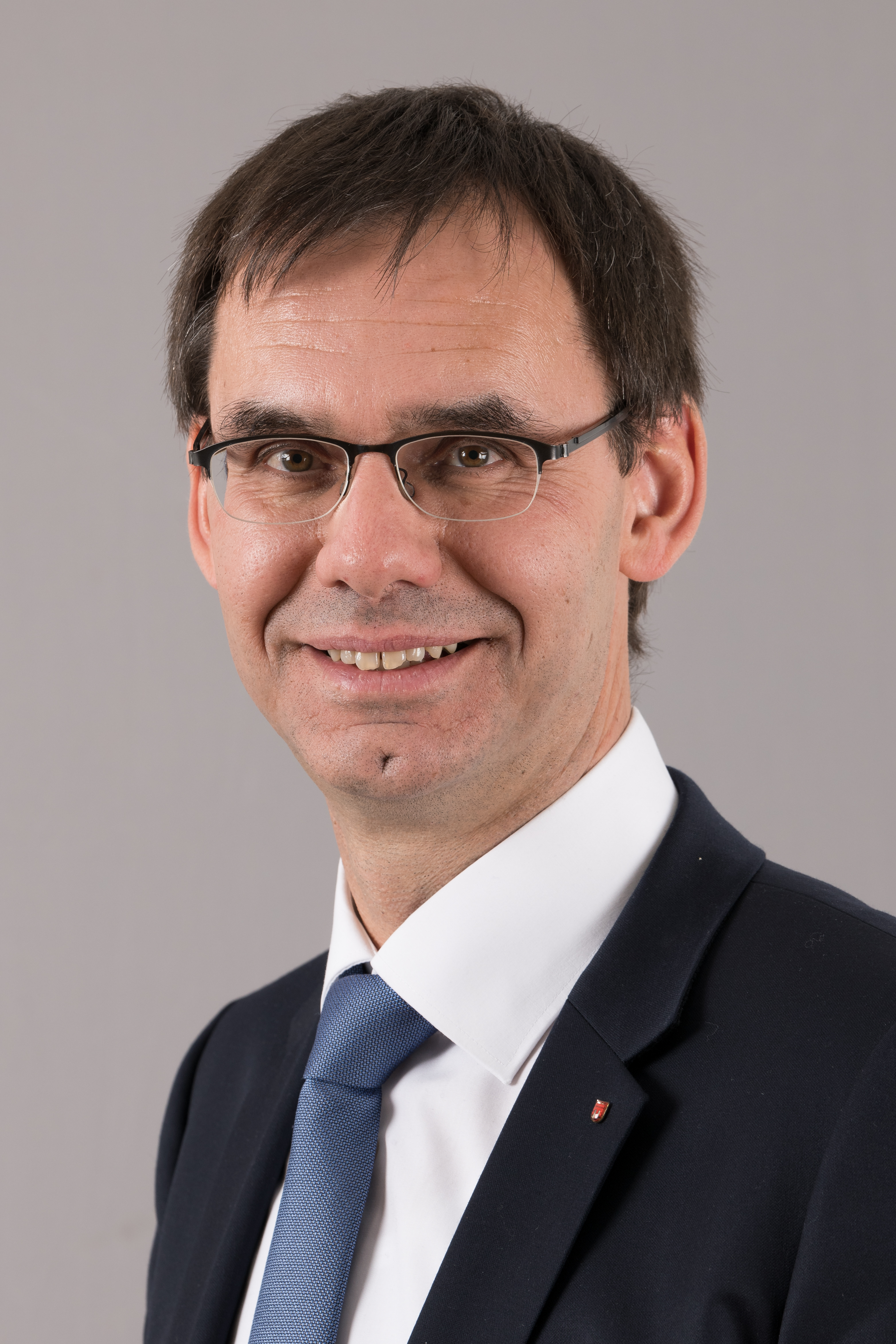

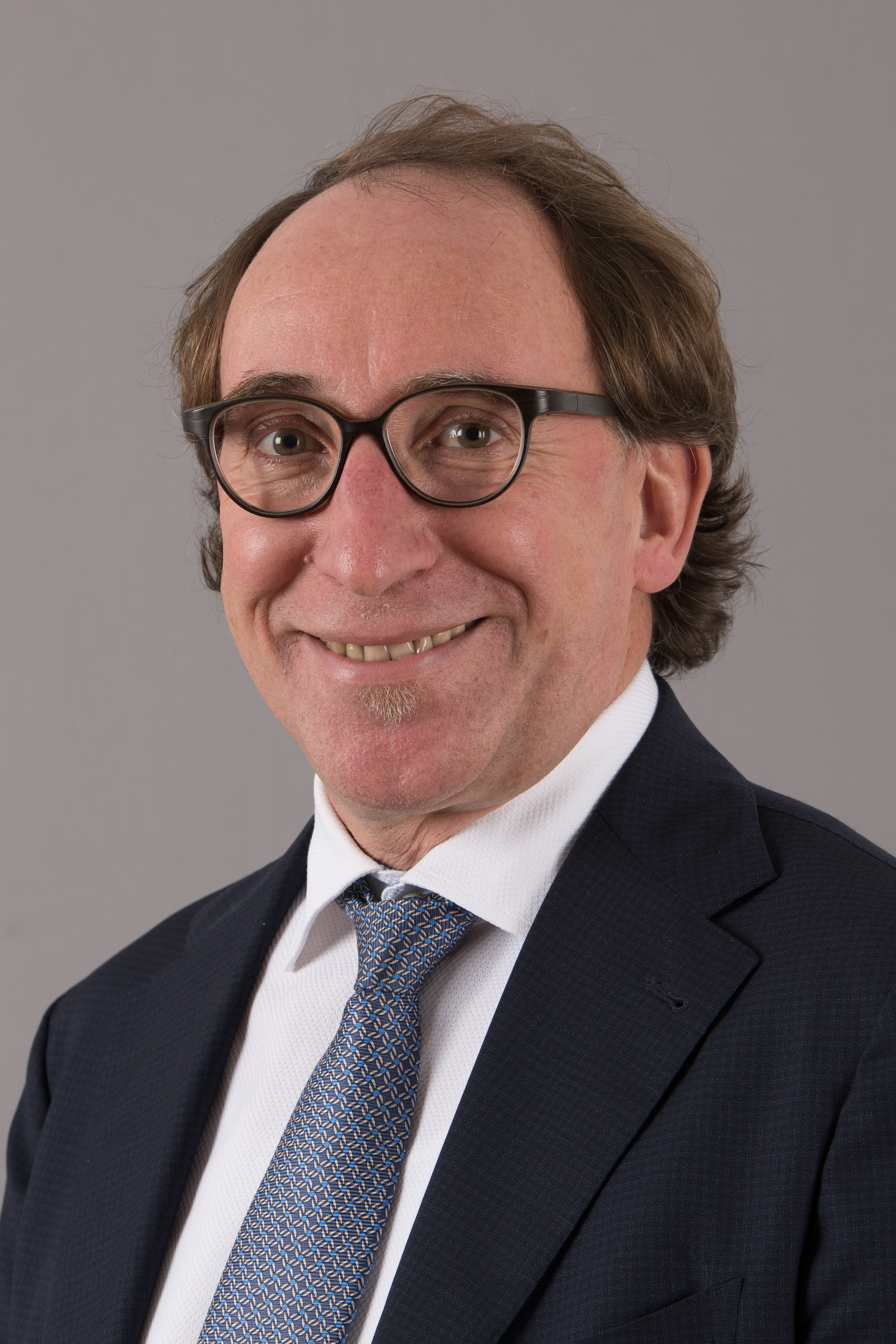

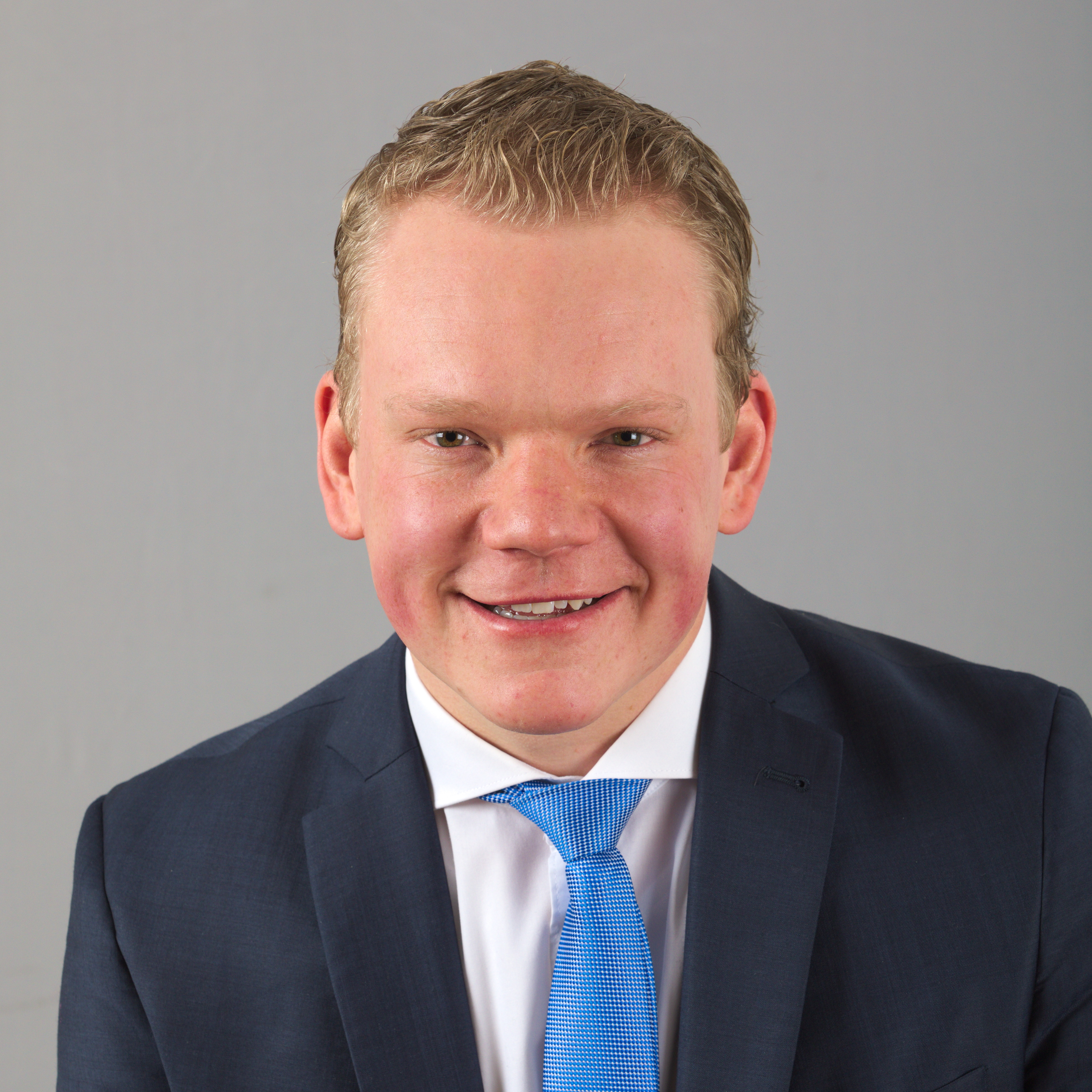

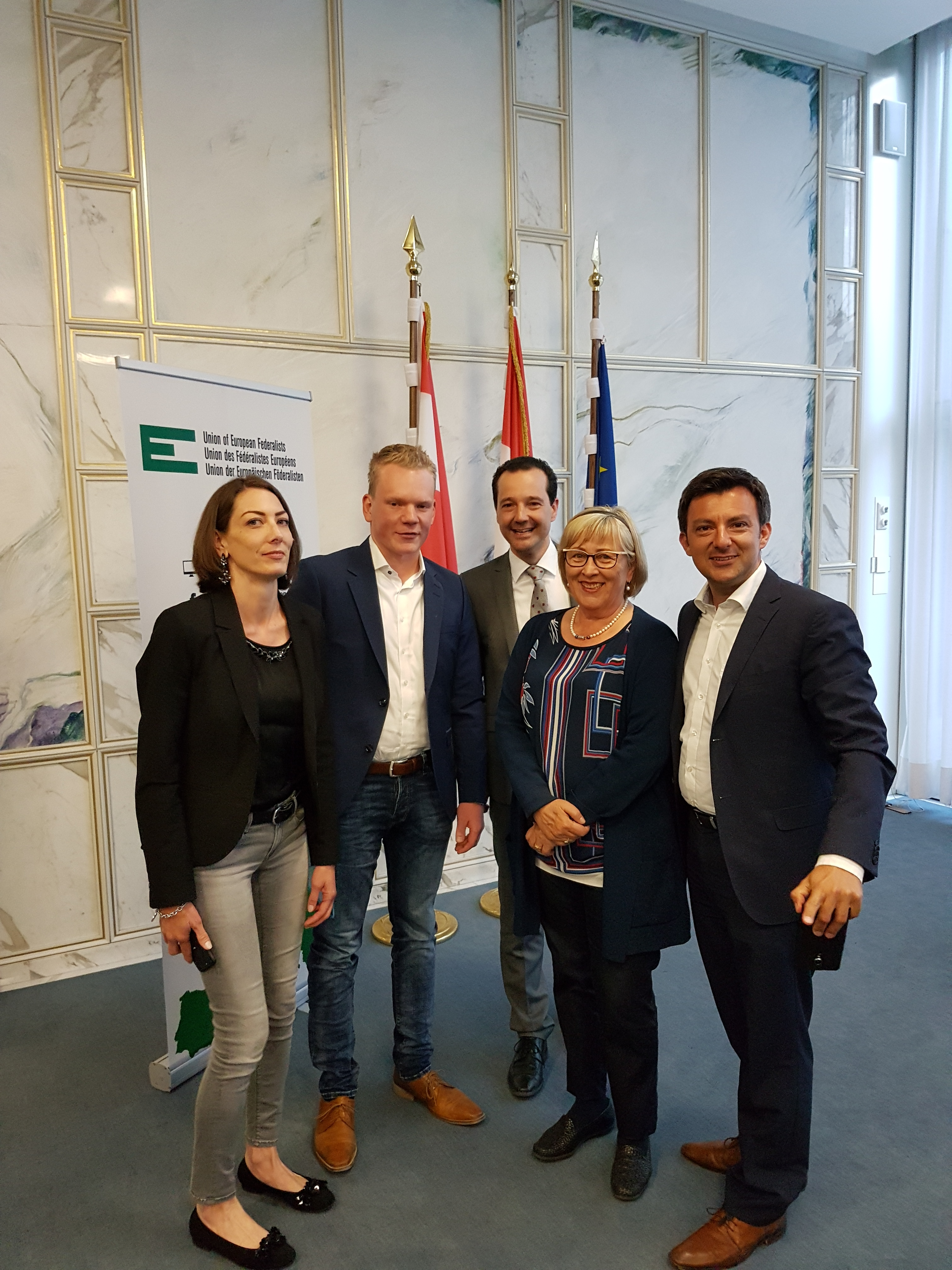

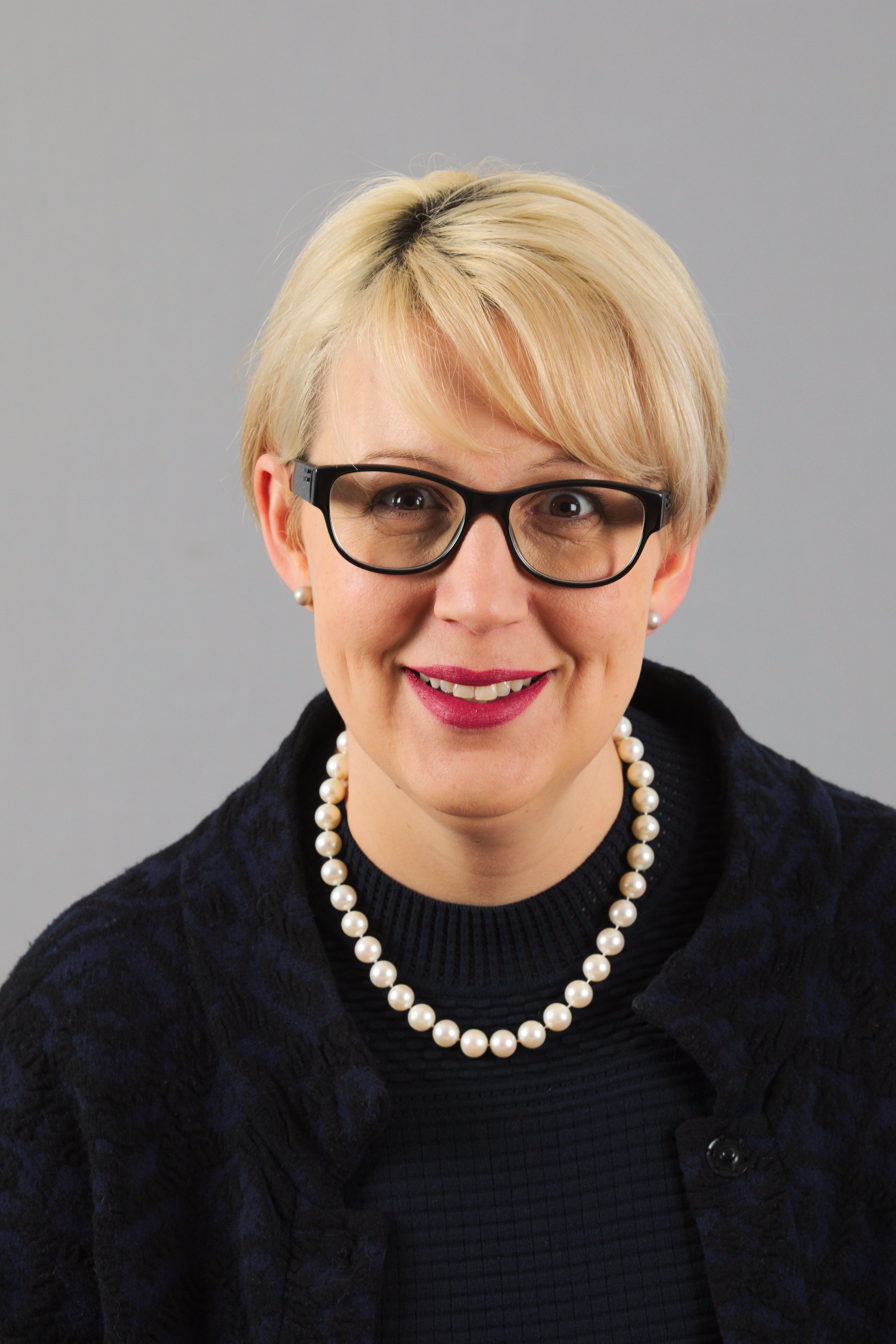
	First party	Second party	Third party
Leader	Markus Wallner	Johannes Rauch	Christof Bitschi
Party	ÖVP	Greens	FPÖ
Last election	16 seats, 41.8%	6 seats, 17.1%	9 seats, 23.4%
Seats won	17	7	5
Seat change	▲1	▲1	▼4
Popular vote	71,911	31,201	23,011
Percentage	43.5%	18.9%	13.9%
Swing	▲1.7%	▲1.7%	▼9.5%
	Fourth party	Fifth party
Leader	Martin Staudinger	Sabine Scheffknecht
Party	SPÖ	NEOS
Last election	3 seats, 8.8%	2 seats, 6.9%
Seats won	4	3
Seat change	▲1	▲1
Popular vote	15,635	14,064
Percentage	9.5%	8.5%
Swing	▲0.7%	▲1.6%
- ÖVP results by municipality. Darker shades indicate a stronger vote share.
Governor before election
Markus Wallner
ÖVP
Elected Governor
Markus Wallner
ÖVP

The 2019 Vorarlberg state election was held on 13 October 2019 to elect the members of the Landtag of Vorarlberg.

The election was marked by major losses for the Freedom Party of Austria (FPÖ), with all other parties benefiting as a result. The Austrian People's Party (ÖVP) and Social Democratic Party of Austria (SPÖ) each improved their vote share for the first time since 2004, though the former failed to regain the absolute majority it had lost in 2014. The Greens moved into second place with a strong result of 18.9%. NEOS – The New Austria (NEOS) sought re-election to a Landtag for the first time and improved its performance to 8.5%.

The election took place just two weeks after the federal election in September, and was viewed as a boost to the prospect of an ÖVP–Green federal coalition, which would mirror the composition of the incumbent Vorarlberg government. The ÖVP–Green government under Governor Markus Wallner was renewed and took office in November.

== Background ==
In the 2014 election, the ÖVP suffered major losses, primarily to the Greens and new party NEOS, and lost its majority. The party subsequently formed a coalition with the Greens.

== Electoral system ==
The 36 seats of the Landtag of Vorarlberg are elected via open list proportional representation in a two-step process. The seats are distributed between four multi-member constituencies, corresponding to the districts of Vorarlberg. For parties to receive any representation in the Landtag, they must either win at least one seat in a constituency directly, or clear a 5 percent state-wide electoral threshold. Seats are distributed in constituencies according to the Hagenbach-Bischoff quota, with any remaining seats allocated at the state level, to ensure overall proportionality between a party's vote share and its share of seats.

== Contesting parties ==
The table below lists parties represented in the previous Landtag.

Name		Ideology	Leader	2014 result	
Name		Ideology	Leader	Votes (%)	Seats
ÖVP	Austrian People's Party; Österreichische Volkspartei	Christian democracy	Markus Wallner	41.8%	16 / 36
FPÖ	Freedom Party of Austria; Freiheitliche Partei Österreichs	Right-wing populism Euroscepticism	Christof Bitschi	23.4%	9 / 36
GRÜNE	The Greens – The Green Alternative; Die Grünen – Die Grüne Alternative	Green politics	Johannes Rauch	17.1%	6 / 36
SPÖ	Social Democratic Party of Austria; Sozialdemokratische Partei Österreichs	Social democracy	Martin Staudinger	8.8%	3 / 36
NEOS	NEOS – The New Austria and Liberal Forum; NEOS – Das Neue Österreich und Liberales Forum	Liberalism; Pro-Europeanism	Sabine Scheffknecht	6.9%	2 / 36

In addition to the parties already represented in the Landtag, seven parties collected enough signatures to be placed on the ballot.

- Home to all Cultures (HAK)
- Xi – Future Opportunity (XI)
- The Change (WANDEL)
- WIR – Platform for Families and Child Protection (WIR)
- Men's Party (M)
- Christian Party of Austria (CPÖ)
- My Vote Counts! (GILT)

== Result ==
Party	Votes	%	+/−	Seats	+/−
Austrian People's Party (ÖVP)	71,911	43.53	+1.74	17	+1
The Greens – The Green Alternative (GRÜNE)	31,201	18.89	+1.74	7	+1
Freedom Party of Austria (FPÖ)	23,011	13.93	–9.49	5	–4
Social Democratic Party of Austria (SPÖ)	15,635	9.46	+0.69	4	+1
NEOS – The New Austria (NEOS)	14,064	8.51	+1.62	3	+1
Home to all Cultures (HAK)	3,066	1.85	New	0	New
Xi – Future Opportunity (XI)	2,481	1.50	New	0	New
The Change (WANDEL)	1,475	0.89	New	0	New
WIR – Platform for Families and Child Protection (WIR)	1,144	0.69	+0.05	0	±0
Men's Party (M)	567	0.34	–0.05	0	±0
Christian Party of Austria (CPÖ)	426	0.26	–0.23	0	±0
My Vote Counts! (GILT)	230	0.14	New	0	New
Invalid/blank votes	919	–	–	–	–
Total	166,130	100	–	36	0
Registered voters/turnout	270,521	61.41	–2.90	–	–
Source: Vorarlberg Government

Popular vote
ÖVP	43.53%
GRÜNE	18.89%
FPÖ	13.93%
SPÖ	9.46%
NEOS	8.51%
Other	5.69%

Landtag seats
ÖVP	47.22%
GRÜNE	19.44%
FPÖ	13.89%
SPÖ	11.11%
NEOS	8.33%

=== Results by constituency ===
Constituency	ÖVP		Grüne		FPÖ		SPÖ		NEOS		Others	Total seats
Constituency	%	S	%	S	%	S	%	S	%	S	%	Total seats
Bludenz	48.2	3	13.3		14.5	1	12.4		7.2		4.5	4
Bregenz	46.2	5	18.6	2	12.7	1	9.2	1	8.2	1	5.2	10
Dornbirn	37.5	3	21.1	1	16.4	1	8.6		9.2		7.1	5
Feldkirch	41.9	4	21.2	2	13.2	1	8.5		9.2	1	5.9	8
Remaining seats		2		2		1		3		1		9
Total	43.5	17	18.9	7	13.9	5	9.5	4	8.5	3	5.7	36
Source: Vorarlberg Government

== Aftermath ==
Governor Wallner held discussions with all parties before entering coalition talks with the Greens. They came to an agreement on 4 November, which was approved by both parties.
