= Gottfried Feurstein =

Austrian economist and politician (1939–2024)

Member of the National Council of Austria
- In office 4 November 1975 – 19 December 2002

Personal details
- Born: 7 March 1939 Andelsbuch, Gau Tirol-Vorarlberg, Ostmark, Germany
- Died: 12 March 2024 (aged 85)
- Party: ÖVP
- Education: University of Innsbruck
- Occupation: Economist

Gottfried Feurstein (7 March 1939 – 12 March 2024) was an Austrian economist and politician. A member of the Austrian People's Party, he served in the National Council from 1975 to 2002.

Feurstein died on 12 March 2024, at the age of 85.
