= Dornbirn District =

Coordinates: 47°25′N 9°45′E

Dornbirn District Bezirk Dornbirn
- District
- Country: Austria
- State: Vorarlberg
- Number of municipalities: 3
- Administrative seat: Dornbirn

Area
  - Total: 172.7 km^{2} (66.7 sq mi)

Population (2012)
  - Total: 82,721
  - Density: 479.0/km^{2} (1,241/sq mi)
- Time zone: UTC+01:00 (CET)
  - Summer (DST): UTC+02:00 (CEST)
- Vehicle registration: DO

The Bezirk Dornbirn is an administrative district (Bezirk) in Vorarlberg, Austria. A rather young district, it was separated from the Feldkirch district in 1969.

The area of the district is 172.7 km^{2}, the population 82,721 (January 1, 2012), which makes a population density of 479 persons per km^{2}. The administrative center of the district is Dornbirn.

Historical population
Year	Pop.	±%
1869	16,801	—
1880	18,056	+7.5%
1890	20,836	+15.4%
1900	25,066	+20.3%
1910	31,159	+24.3%
1923	27,899	−10.5%
1934	30,897	+10.7%
1939	32,079	+3.8%
1951	39,814	+24.1%
1961	49,845	+25.2%
1971	62,051	+24.5%
1981	68,708	+10.7%
1991	72,750	+5.9%
2001	75,901	+4.3%
Source: Statistik Austria

== Administrative divisions ==
The district consists of three municipalities, two of which (Dornbirn and Hohenems) are towns, the third (Lustenau) being the largest market town in Austria. Hohenems is the youngest town in Vorarlberg to have received town privileges (in 1983).

=== Towns ===
1. Dornbirn (46.080)
2. Hohenems (15.350)

=== Market town ===
1. Lustenau (21.291)

(population numbers January 1, 2012)
