= Landtag of Vorarlberg =

Austrian state parliament

State Diet of Vorarlberg Vorarlberger Landtag
- 23rd Landtag of Vorarlberg
- Established: 1919

Leadership
- Governor: Markus Wallner, Austrian People's Party

Structure
- Seats: 36
- Political groups: Government (26): ÖVP (15); FPÖ (11); Opposition (10): GRÜNE (4); SPÖ (3); NEOS (3)
- Length of term: 5 years

Elections
- Last election: 13 October 2024
- Next election: 2029

Meeting place
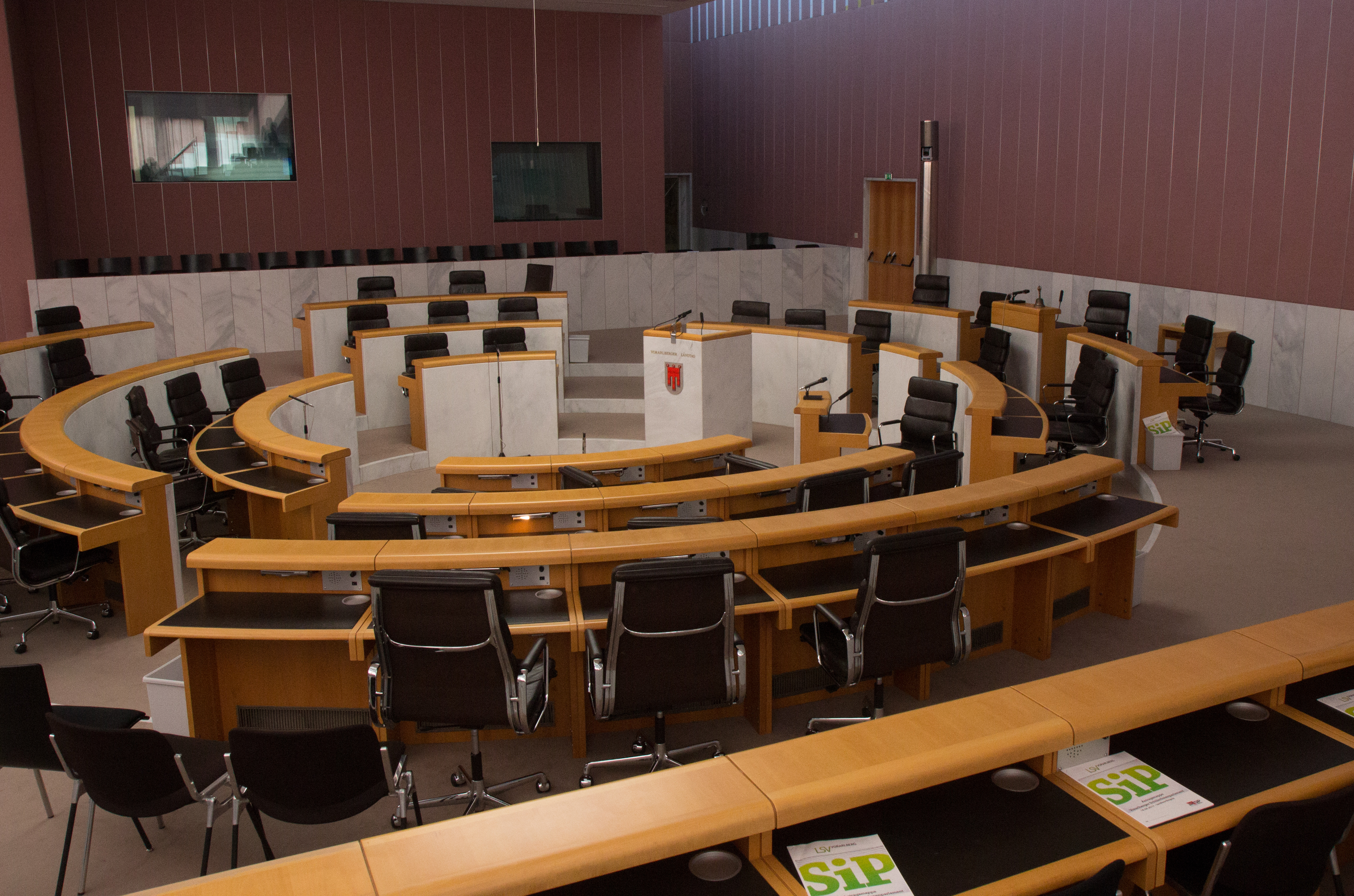
- Landhaus Bregenz

The Landtag of Vorarlberg (German: Vorarlberger Landtag) is the democratically elected parliament of Vorarlberg, Austria.
