= Walser migrations =

Migrations of the Walser people, 1150–1450

The Walser migrations (German: Walserwanderungen) (Italian: Migrazioni Walser) were a series of migrations by the Walser people from the Upper Rhône Valley in Valais to areas of the Alps. The migrations lasted from c.1150 to c.1450 and represented one of the last large movements of people in the Middle Ages.

== Background ==
The Alps had been viewed as hard to live in for centuries with the Romans calling them "cursed earth" (Latin: terra maledicta). This inhospitability was due to their isolation, cold climate, and high elevation. Due to these factors the Alps had and continue to have a low population. But by the year 1000 the Medieval Warm Period led to better climate conditions allowing for population growth.

== Causes ==
The reason for the Migration are the subject of frequent debate. Though overpopulation in the Rhône Valley, and the end of the Medieval Warm Period in 1300 AD, and forced migration by feudal lords, ecclesiastical and feudal rivalries likely contributed to the migration. With other factors like plague, desire for adventure, and natural disasters being possibilities. The overpopulation theory is supported by the fact that the areas the Walsers settled were often sparsely inhabited or uninhabited and the Medieval Warm Period allowed for areas previously with few to no inhabitants to support significant populations. The forced migration theory is also supported by the fact that feudal lords in the area are recorded as having often relocated populations to ensure their control of territories.

== The migration ==
After leaving the Conches valley, most of those migrating passed through Val Formazza in Italy on their way to the Rhaetian alps. This path has been called "The Great Walser Route" and several similar variations. From their origins in Valais, the Walsers migrated to areas in modern-day Aosta Valley, Vorarlberg, Bavaria, Ticino, Uri, Bern, and Grisons, Savoy, and possibly France. It is recorded that the communities set up were given the right to settle areas freely and have independent courts. In exchange they had to pay an interest and to serve in the military. This was known as the Walserrecht or Walser right. The independent courts were effective at managing their own affairs and as such were only completely abolished in Switzerland in 1805.

== Aftermath ==
The migration of the Walsers would significantly influence the areas the Walsers migrated into. In the Three Leagues the Walsers would fill important military and political positions. They would also weaken the prince-bishops of Sion and local feudal lords through force. Additionally they serve important roles as seasonal laborers and travel through the Alps.

The Walser community in Grisons would significantly divide the pre-existing Romansh communities resulting the emergence of separate Romansh dialects. But at the same time the Romansh and Walser communities would have a significant amount of cultural contact and intermarriage. A similar pattern can be observed across the areas of migration where Walsers would form pockets of Germanicism among a larger population of Romance people, with significant amount of assimilation, intermarriage, and cultural contact.

During and after the migration many communities collapsed due to the difficult lifestyle and the end of the Medieval Warm Period. Over the centuries many of the communities would assimilate to the nearby cultures. Two examples are the skiing and resort town of Davos, first settled by Walsers in 1289, where in 1985 only 2% of the population spoke Walser German, and the settlements in Savoy which assimilated centuries ago. Centuries after the migration many famous skiing resorts and mountain would be in lands settled by the Walsers.

== Settlements ==
During their migrations the Walsers founded and settled many areas.

Switzerland: Simplon, Bosco Gurin, Obersaxen, Vals, St. Martin, Versam, Valendas, Tenna, Safien, Medels, Nufenen, Splügen, Sufers, Hinterrhein, Avers, Arosa, Langwies, Mutten, Schmitten, Wiesen, Davos, Klosters, Furna, Says, St. Antönien, Valzeina

Italy: Gressoney-La Trinité, Gressoney-Saint Jean, Issime, Gaby, Formazza, Macugnaga, Alagna Valsesia, Rima San Giuseppe, Rimella

Austria: Blons, Fontanella, Raggal, Sankt Gerold, Sonntag, Thüringerberg, Mittelberg, Brandnertal, Silbertal, Laterns, Schröcken, Lech, Warth, Galtür

Liechtenstein: Triesenberg
