= Biosphere Reserve Großes Walsertal =

Austrian nature reserve

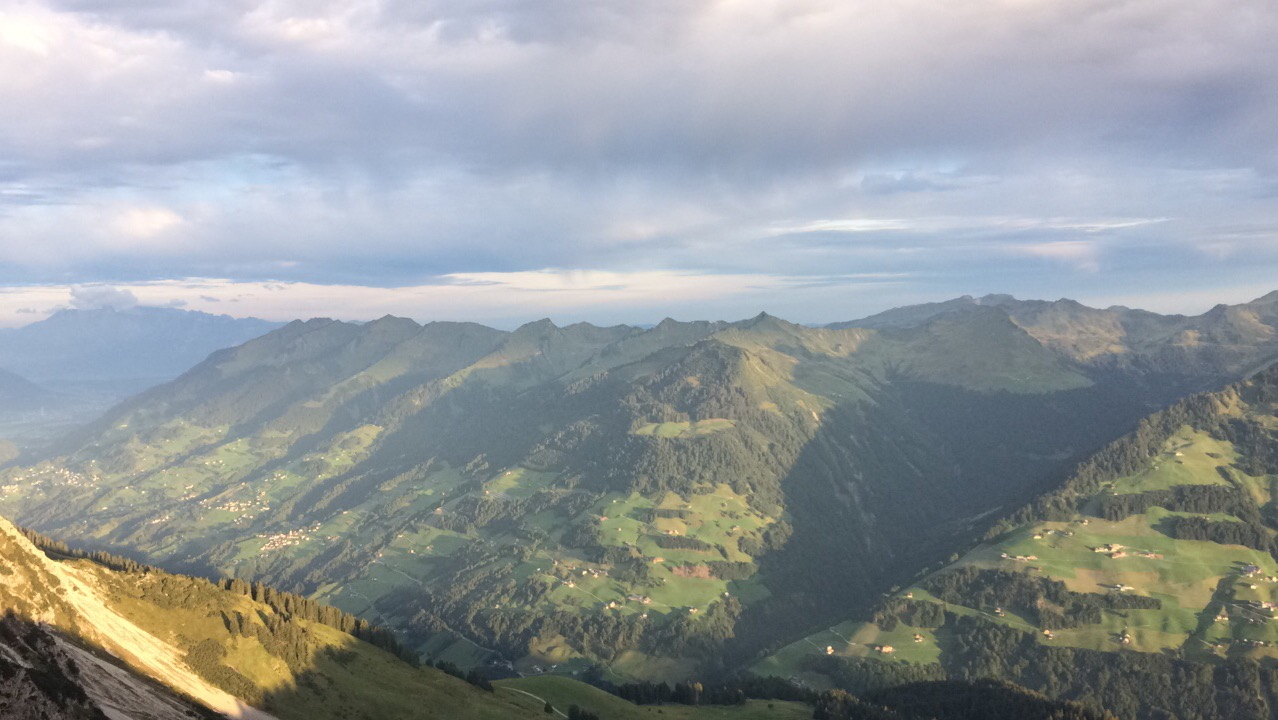
- View upon the Biosphere Park Großes Walsertal from the Alpe Steris

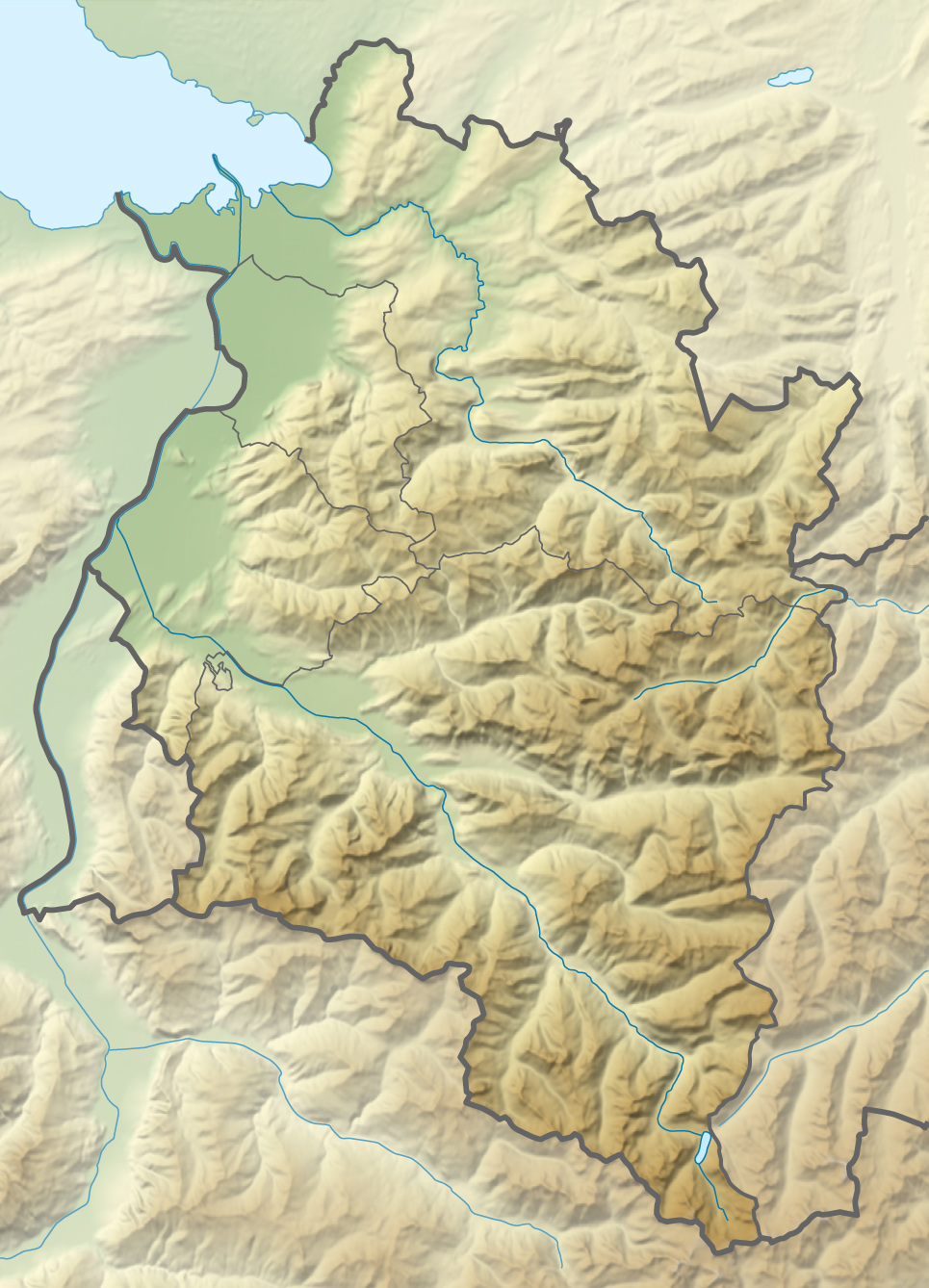
- Location within Vorarlberg Location within Austria
- Location: Großes Walsertal, Vorarlberg (Austria)
- Coordinates: 47.13°N 9.55°E
- Area: 19,231 ha
- Visitors: Approx. 180,000 overnight stays per year
- World Heritage site: 2000 (UNESCO)
- Website: www.grosseswalsertal.at

The Biosphere Reserve Großes Walsertal (German: Biosphärenpark Großes Walsertal) is a protected nature reserve in the Austrian state of Vorarlberg.

The area of the nature reserve covers 19,231 ha. There are 3,420 inhabitants and around 180 farms (42 % of which are organic). The reserve strives for a sustainable economy and tourism in the region and provides a platform for discussion about society, politics and science. The Biosphere Reserve Großes Walsertal has been a UNESCO biosphere reserve since November 2000.

== Geography ==
The Biosphere Reserve Großes Walsertal is situated in the eponymous Großes Walsertal. It stretches across the municipalities of Blons, Fontanella, Raggal, Sonntag, St. Gerold and Thüringerberg.

The northern part is characterised by the flysch mountains of the Walserkamm, the southern part by the rugged peaks and scree slopes of the Kalkhochalpen.

=== Zones ===
In order to fulfill the diverse tasks of protection of natural diversity, sustainable development, education and research, biosphere parks are divided into zones. Different focal points are assigned to each of these zones.

- Core zone: Core zones are used for classic nature conservation. In these areas, ecosystems can develop (almost) without human influence. Overall, the core zones in the Biosphere Park Großes Walsertal make up almost 20% of the total area of the valley. This means that these zones are much larger than specified in the national regulations with at least 5%. The core zones include the Gadental (nature reserve and Natura 2000 area), Faludriga-Nova (nature reserve), the Tiefenwald high moor (high moor protection), the upper reaches of the river Lutz (river protection), Kirschwald-Ischkarnei and the Rote Wand (protection of the alpine region).
- Maintenance zone: The maintenance zone with near-natural habitats is located between the core and development zone. Environmentally friendly forms of use such as the use of wood, meadow and pasture farming, but also tourism and educational activities are possible here. In the Großes Walsertal Biosphere Park, the maintenance zone mainly includes extensive alpine pastures, traditionally used mountain meadows and mountain forests, which together make up around 65% of the total area. According to national criteria, the maintenance zones together with the core zones should take up at least 20% of the total area.
- Development zone: The development zone is the living, economic and recreational area of the population and also includes the settlement areas. The aim is to try out sustainable economic methods that meet the demands of people and nature in equal measure. Here are the possibilities for the development of environmentally and socially compatible tourism, but also for businesses and services that are based on environmental and social criteria. In the Großer Walsertal, the entire permanent settlement area belongs to the development zone.
- Regeneration zone: Regeneration zones are not absolutely necessary. Their aim is to restore the ecological functionality. In the Großes Walsertal, the diverted Lutz river is designated as a regeneration zone below the reservoir. The development goal is to achieve that enough water flows again in the removal section of the Lutz.
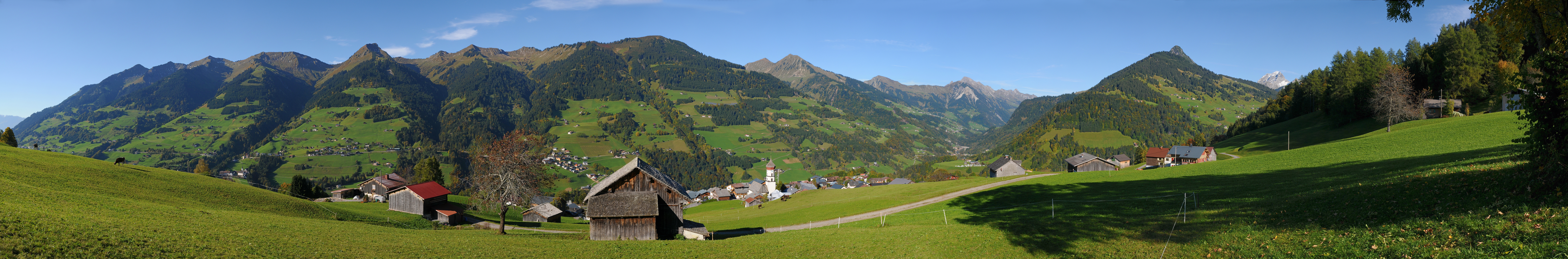
  Panorama of the whole Großes Walsertal with all of its villages, taken over the height of Raggal, at 1071 m, from left to right: Thüringerberg, Sankt Gerold, Blons, Raggal, Sonntag and Fontanella.

== Culture ==
The biosphärenpark.haus is the visitor center of the biosphere nature reserve. The Biosphere Reserve Exhibition inside the biosphärenpark house offers background information in the form of films, interactive modules, showcases and a herbarium.

The Walserherbst ("Walser autumn") is a music, literature and culinary festival located in the nature reserve. The festival is held every other year in August/September and lasts for three weeks.

The Walderlebnispfad Marul ("Forest Adventure Trail") is a hiking trail with games of skill, points of interest for nature, information about flora and fauna and culture and history about the mountain environment. Hikers can choose between the short (3.4 km length, walking time approx. 1½ hours, approx. 300 meters in altitude) and the long route (5.6 km in length, walking time about 2½ hours, about 450 meters in altitude).

The Deanery St. Gerold is the cultural center in the valley. Since the 10th century, the Deanery has been in the possession of the Benedictines. At the bottom a footpath leads along lakes through the forest.

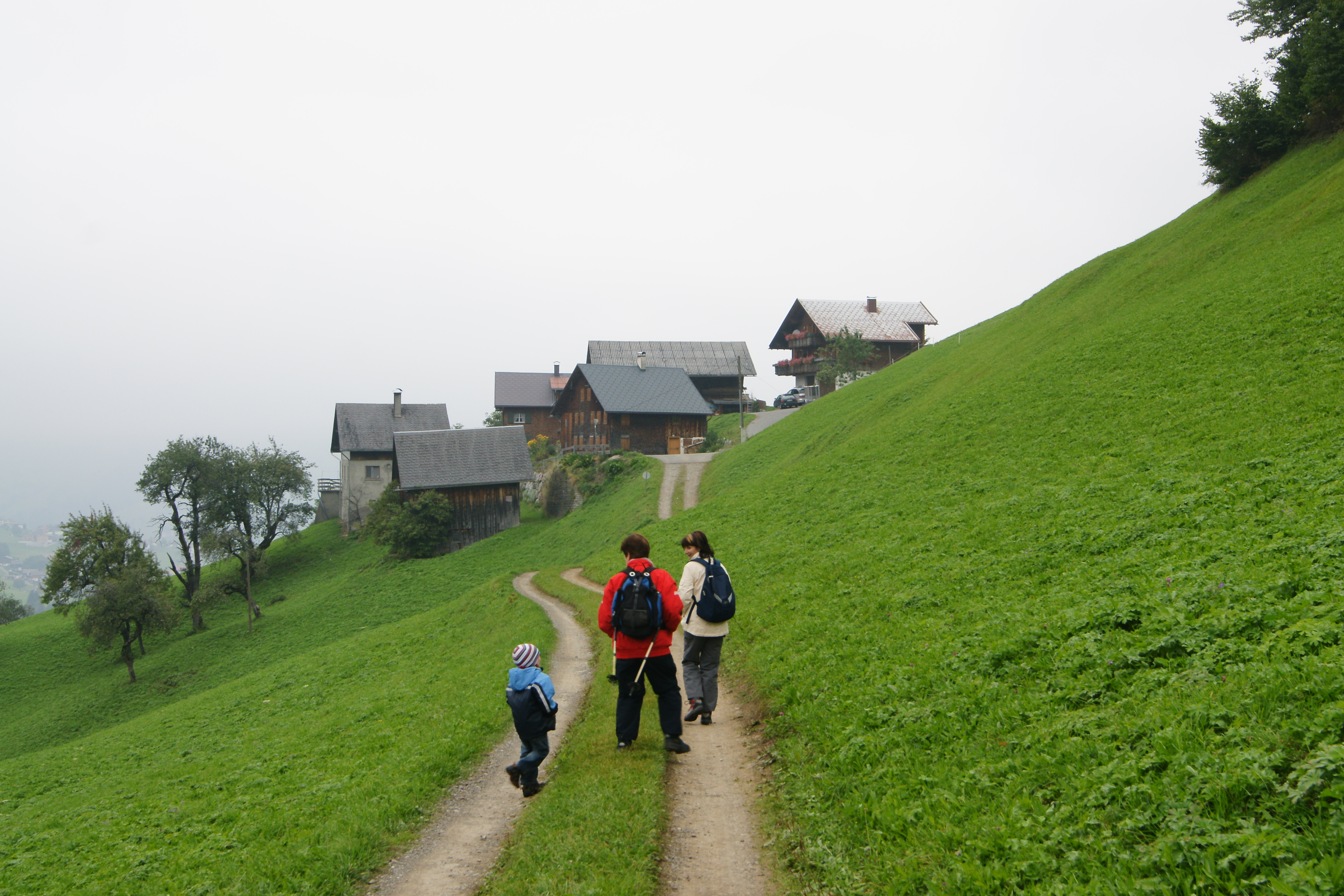
Hiking along the Marul hiking trail

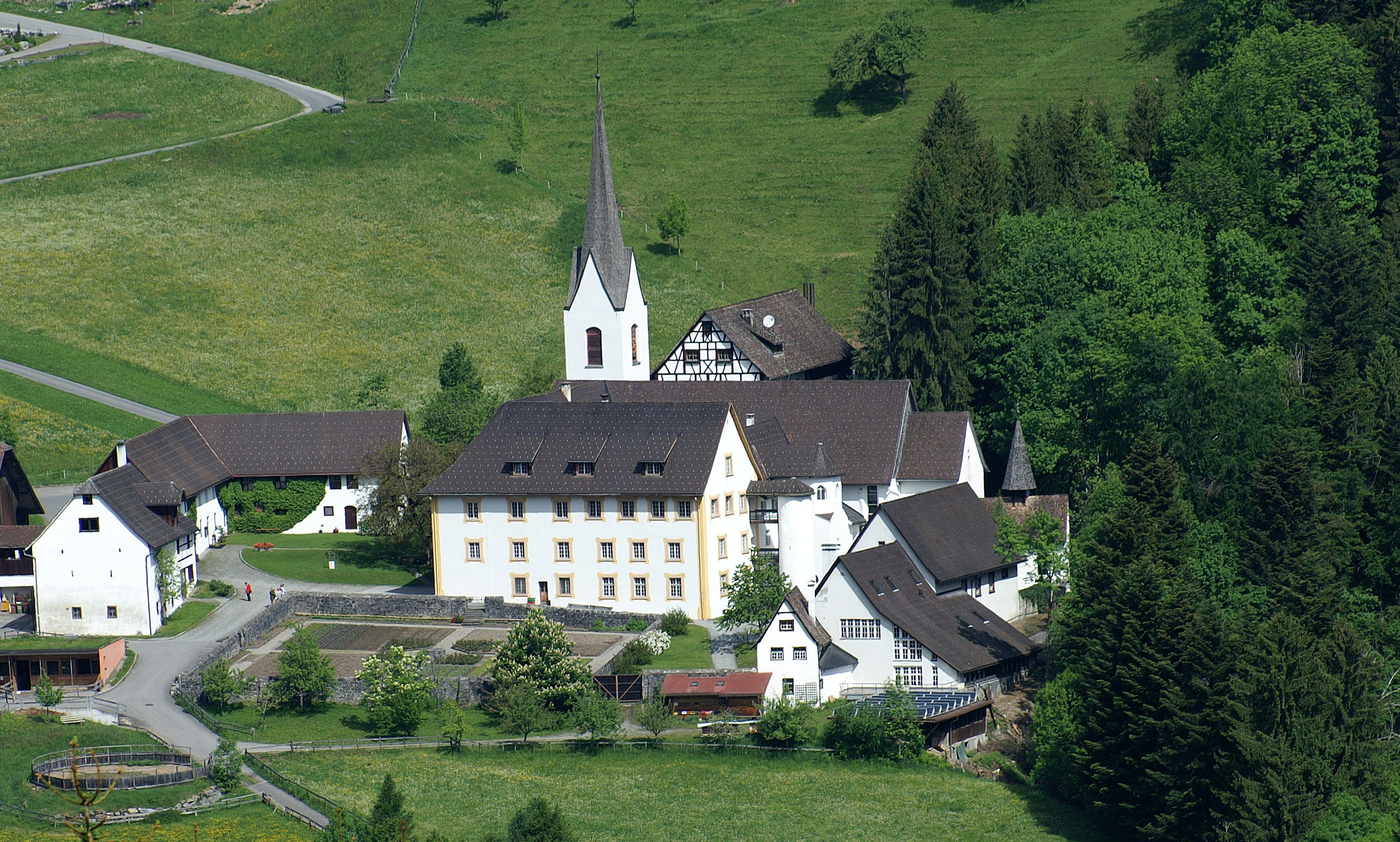
The Benedictine Abbey of Saint Gerold

== See also ==
- Großes Walsertal
- Nature reserve
