= Großwalsertal =

Valley in Vorarlberg, Austria

Großes Walsertal
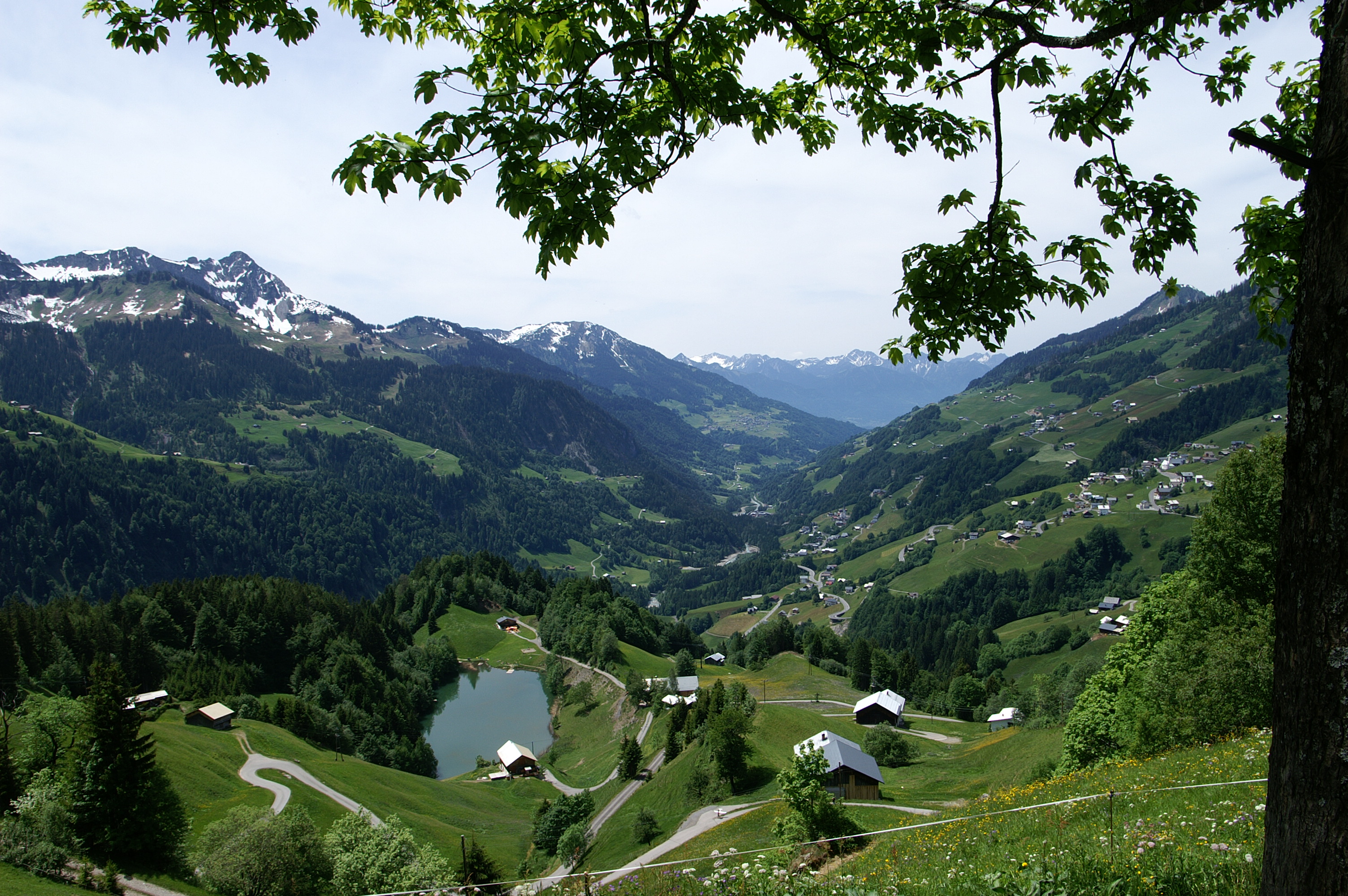
- View south-westward from the foot of Blasenka over the Seewaldsee, the only lake of the valley, strangely on the ridge, and the lower Großwalsertal

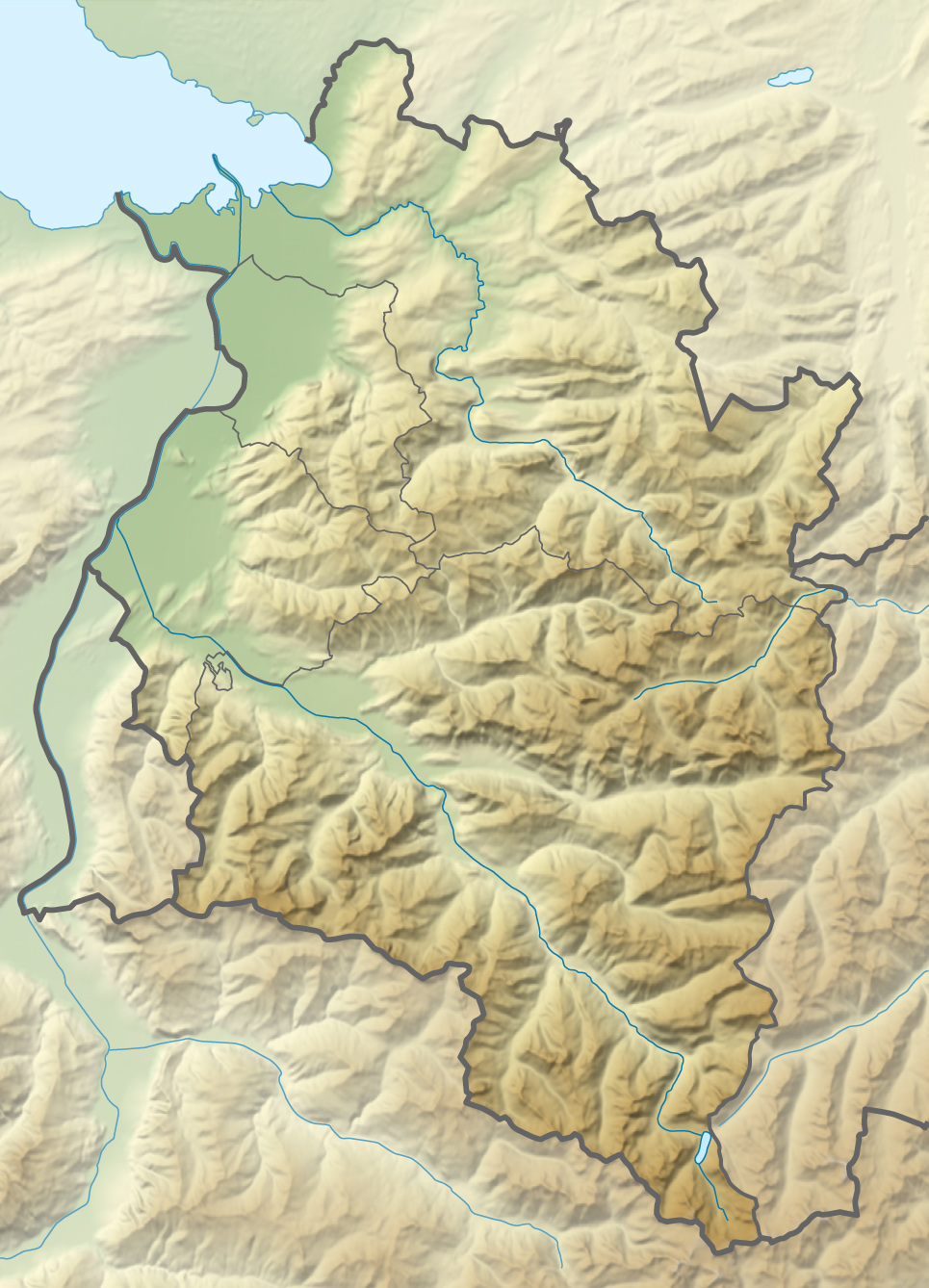
- Location within Vorarlberg
- Length: 25

Geology
- Type: V-shaped valley

Geography
- Location: Vorarlberg, Austria
- Coordinates: 47°14′29″N 9°56′22″E
- Rivers: Lutz
- Interactive map of Großes Walsertal

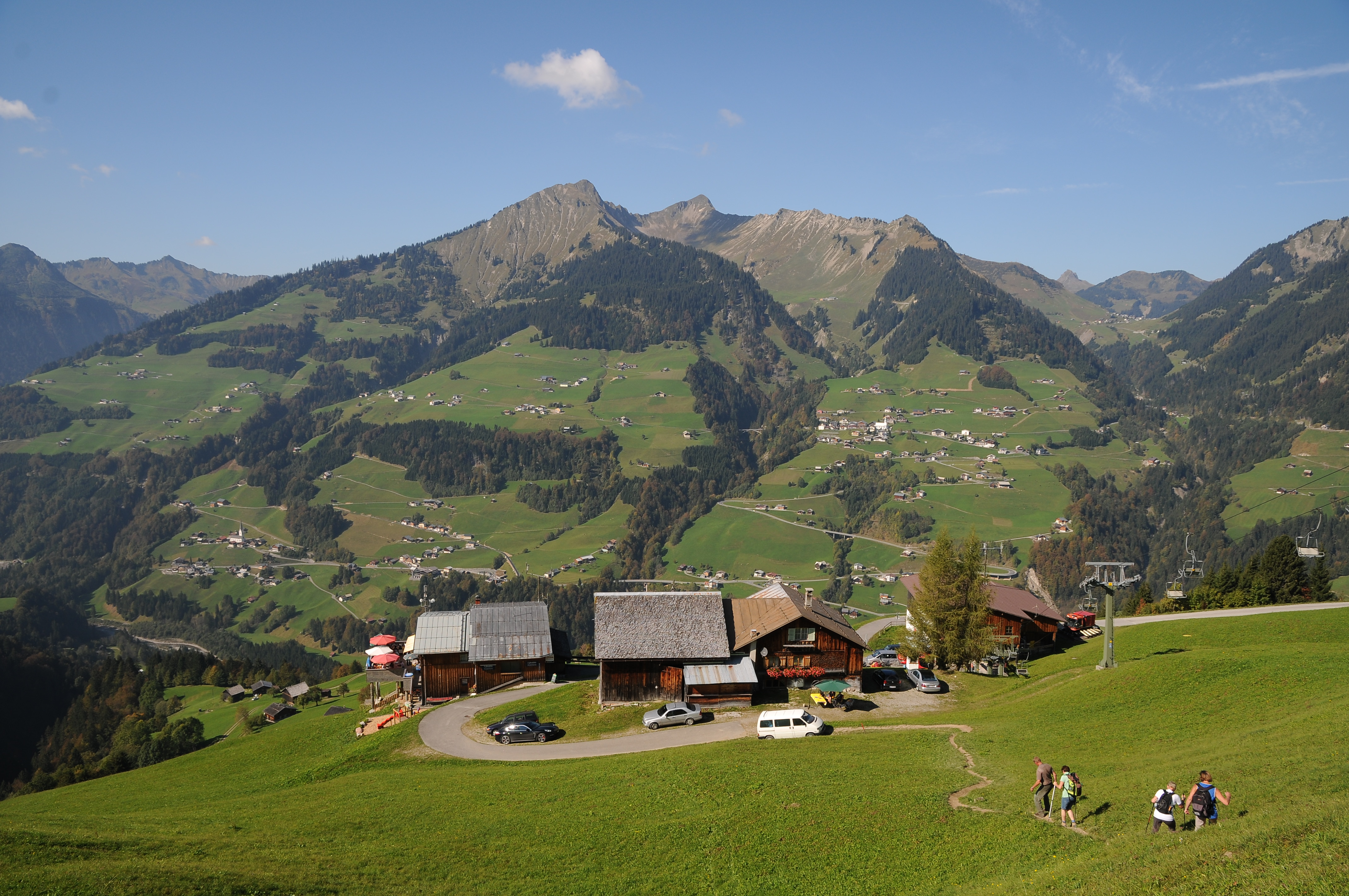
Großwalsertal from Sonntag Stein

The Großes Walsertal (German: Großes Walsertal, Großwalsertal) is a valley located in the Austrian state of Vorarlberg. It is a side valley of the Walgau and stretches from there north to the mountainous center of the country. The end of the valley borders on the Bregenz Forest.

== Etymology ==
The name of the valley derives from the Walsers who moved there from the Valais (German: Wallis) in the 13th century (see also "Kleinwalsertal").

== Geography ==
=== Location and landscape ===
The valley Großes Walsertal is located in the northern Limestone Alps between the subgroups of the Bregenz Forest mountain range (in the north) and the Lechquellen Mountains (in the south and east).

The Lutz river flows through the approximately 25 km long alpine saw-cut valley. Especially the north, which still belongs to the flysch-zone, shows the typical small-round and round-capped tributaries and secondary valleys.

=== Communities ===
The municipalities are almost all situated on the Sonn-hillside, the north side of the valley.

From the beginning of the valley, the communities are:

- Thüringerberg
- Sankt Gerold
- Blons
- Fontanella
- Sonntag
- The Sonntager part of Buchboden is also located north of the river, the municipality covers the whole valley end.

South of Lutz lies:

- Raggal

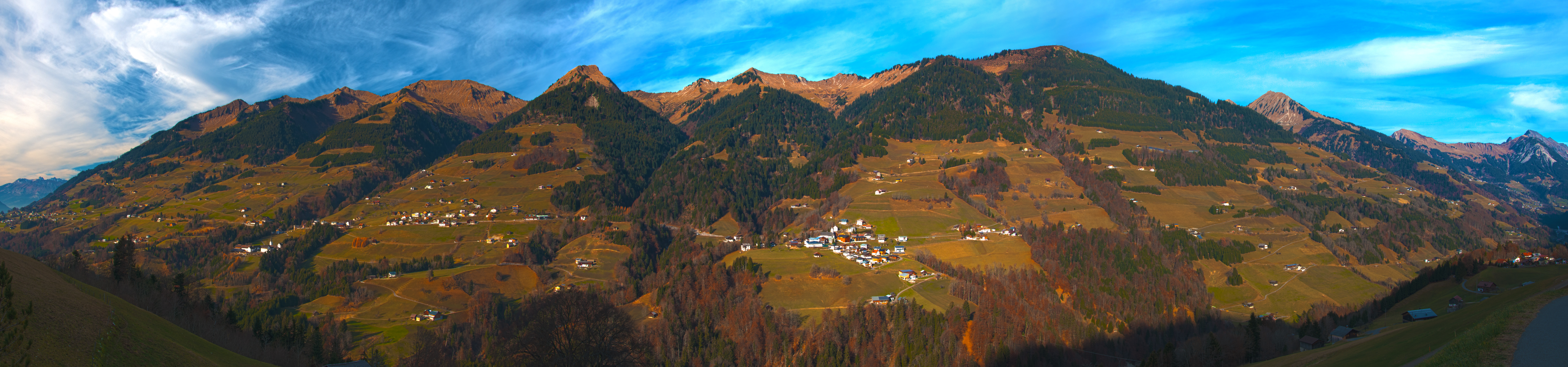
Panorama of Blons and the Großwalsertal (view from Raggal) in November 2011

=== Traffic ===
The well-developed street Faschina (formerly Bundesstraße 193, now L 193) leads through the valley on a western slope. At the Faschina Pass at 1485 meters above sea level, the street leaves the valley and descends via Damüls to Au in the Bregenz Forest.

The Schadonapass at the end of the valley (Biberacher hut) leads to the Hinterwald near Rehmen (municipality of Au) via a hiking-trail.

== Culture ==
Since 2004, the cultural festival Walserherbst has been held every two years. For three weeks, the festival offers contemporary art and culture experiences in the middle of the Großwalsertal. The program includes literature, film, music, theater, exhibitions and workshops. The self-image of the festival is characterised by "openness to new ideas through the joy of meeting people". This description was chosen because cultural exchange has always been a defining component of the Walser ethnic group living there who immigrated from Valais some centuries ago.

The Great Walser Valley and its mountaineering villages are part of the Austrian Alpine Club's initiative to promote sustainable tourism.

== Biosphere Park Großes Walsertal ==
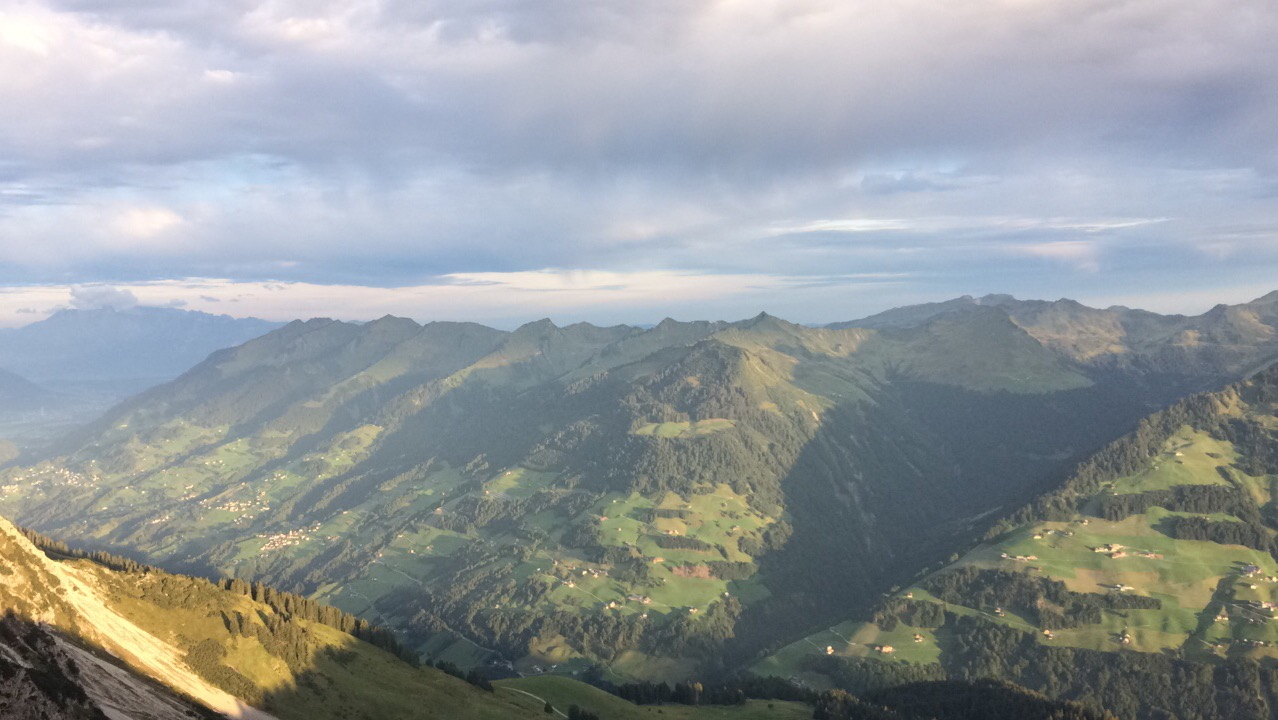
View of the Biosphere Park Großes Walsertal

The municipalities of the Great Walser Valley have joined together to form the Biosphere Park Großes Walsertal, Vorarlberg's first nature park, which is a biosphere reserve awarded by UNESCO. In a biosphere park, man and nature are to interact and complement each other positively. On November 10, 2000, the region was included in the list of the global model regions for sustainable living and farming.

Acceptance among the population, as requested by UNESCO in the context of Local Agenda 21 for biosphere parks, is excellent. The project has also won numerous awards, including the 2002 European Village Renewal Award, the 2009 EDEN Award (European Destinations of Excellence) and the 2010 European Energy Award in silver.
