= Der Atem des Himmels =

Der Atem des Himmels is an Austrian feature film. It was filmed in 2010. The Austrian musician and author Reinhold Bilgeri produced and directed the film, which is based on his 2005 historic novel of the same name. The events in the movie are based on the worst avalanche catastrophe in Alpine history.

== Plot ==
In the fall of 1953, a 41-year-old woman, Erna von Gaderthurn, leaves her arrogant and domineering mother shortly after her father dies to take up a position as teacher in the small village of Blons high in the Vorarlberg in western Austria. There she enchants the local men, in particular the other school teacher, Eugenio Casagrande, and the aristocratic Baron von Kessel, who owns the mountain land above the village but does not live there. Casagrande has been pressing the Baron to give the village better avalanche protection or sell land so that the village can do it. The Baron argues that the reforestation is adequate. Their conflicts over the issue become entwined with their sparring for Erna's love. Eugenio wins out and as winter closes in, the two start a life together with Eugenio's daughter Pia.

On January eleventh of the following year, successive avalanches descend down Mount Calv onto Blons, destroying most of the village and killing over fifty people. Erna and Pia survive, but Eugenio dies of loss of blood after being smashed into by timber from his house during the last avalanche. A denouement shows that Erna decides to stay in Blons, raising the orphaned Pia and the son, whom she names Eugenio, that she bears from her dead lover.

== Production and distribution ==
The piece was shot near the original village, in Großes Walsertal in Vorarlberg. Blons was re-created for the movie. Expenses for the film included 3.5 million euros for production and a planned 1.5 million for marketing. Financial assistance came from Filmfonds Wien and production assistance from ORF and ZDF. The world premier was on 24 August 2010 at the Bregenzer Festspiele, while the theater start in Austria was on 3 September that year. Since then, it has been released in a version with Mongolian subtitles and as a DVD with English subtitles.

== Historical background ==
Blons, as other high Großer Walsertal communities, was primarily dependent on animal husbandry. The cows deprecated the mountain forests on Mont Calv, which serve as natural avalanche protection. As Eugenio says in the movie, there had been destructive avalanches there in the past (1497, 1689, 1717, 1806, 1808, and 1853). As depicted in the movie, winter was unusually mild until the end of 1953. But then snow came around New Years. In the morning of January eleventh, the first avalanche hit, followed in the evening by a second, burying and killing residents and destroying many buildings. Survivors struggled alone to find anyone buried in the snow but still alive, until the next day, when help came from neighboring St. Gerold. A total of fifty-six people perished in the town, while an additional thirty-one people died in nearby places, with a total of 125 in the Vorarlberg. In the movie, a helicopter is used to try to rescue Eugenio, as a nod to this catastrophe seeing the first use of such aircraft in European rescue operations. The assistance of French and American rescue personnel is also reflected in the movie.

== Awards ==
- Best foreign film at the Golden Rooster and Hundred Flowers Film Festival 2011 in China
- One of three nominees for best film in the 2011 Romy Awards
- Nomination at the Austrian Film Awards
  - Best Original Music: Raimund Hepp

== Note ==
Most of the content of this article is from the German Wikipedia articles about the movie and the disaster.
