= Monte Tagliaferro =

Mountain in Italy

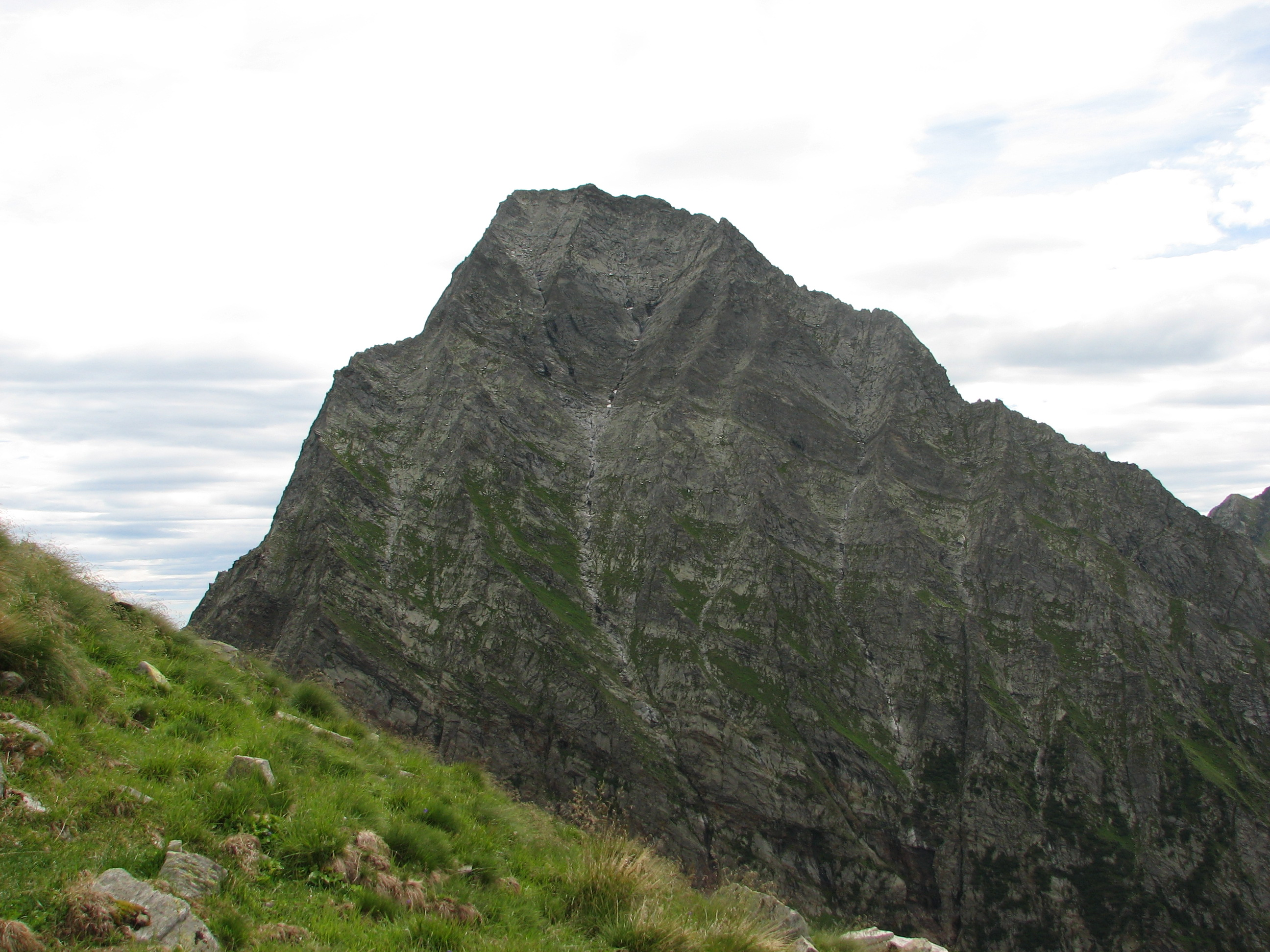
- NW face

Highest point
- Elevation: 2,964 m (9,724 ft)
- Prominence: 637 m (2,090 ft)
- Isolation: 4.16 km (2.58 mi)
- Listing: Alpine mountains 2500-2999 m
- Coordinates: 45°52′20″N 07°58′13″E

Geography
- Location within Alps
- Location: Province of Vercelli, northern Italy
- Parent range: Pennine Alps

Climbing
- Easiest route: from Rima San Giuseppe

Monte Tagliaferro is a mountain of the Pennine Alps. It is one of the most popular hiking destination of Valsesia.

== Etymology ==
The name, which literally means iron cutting, may come from a sharp stone block located not far away from the top.

== Geography ==
The mountain is located in Valsesia (VC, Piemonte region). Administratively it is divided between the comunes of Alagna Valsesia and Alto Sermenza.

=== SOIUSA classification ===
According to the SOIUSA (International Standardized Mountain Subdivision of the Alps) the mountain can be classified in the following way:

- main part = Western Alps
- major sector = North Western Alps
- section = Pennine Alps
- subsection = Eastern Aosta and Northern Valsesia Alps
- supergroup = Contrafforti valsesiani del Monte Rosa
- group = Costiera Punta Grober-Tagliaferro-Montevecchio
- subgroup = Costiera del Tagliaferro
- sector of subgroup = Contrafforte Piglimò-Tagliaferro
- code = I/B-9.III-C.7.b/a

== Access to the summit ==
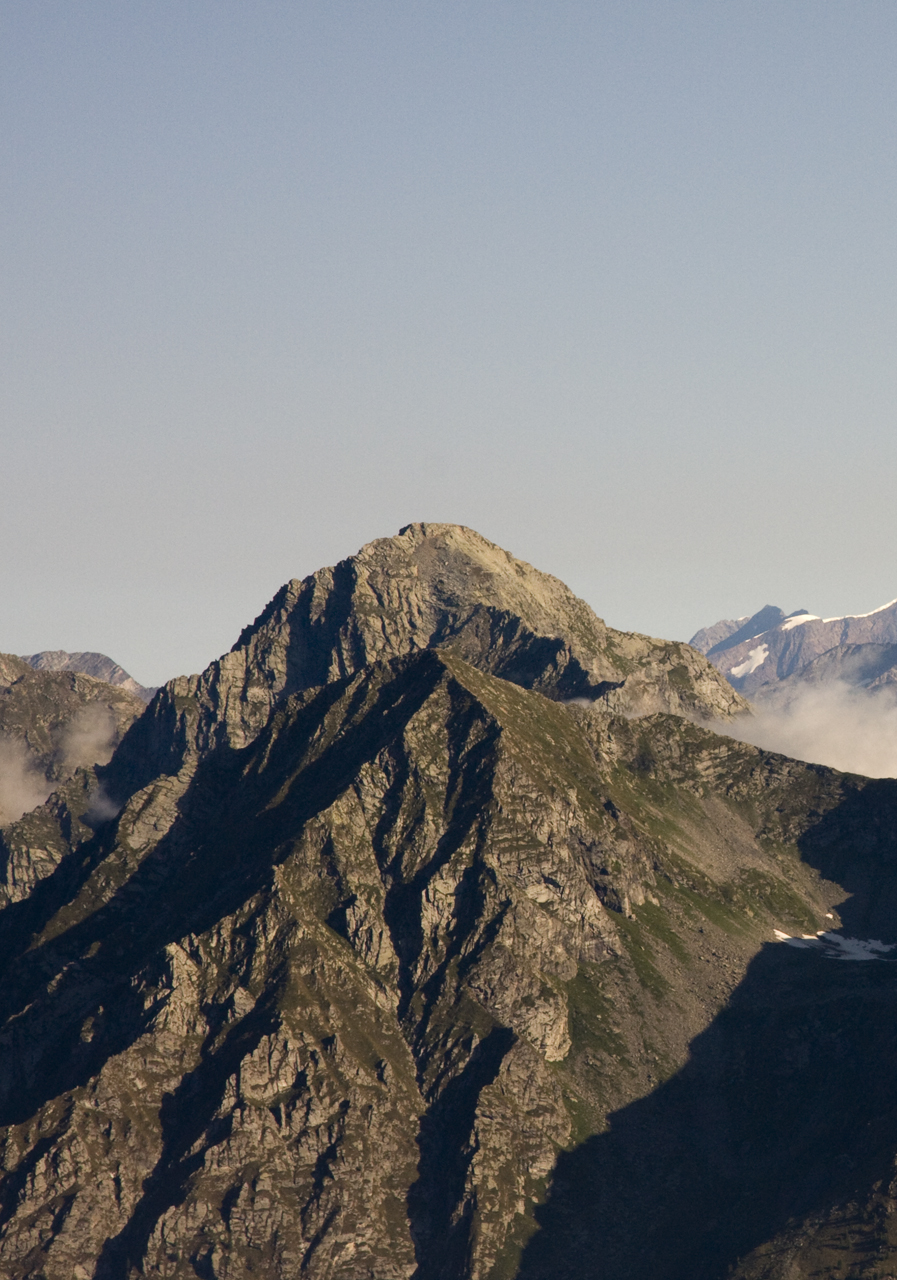
The south face from Punta Sivella

The easiest route for the summit starts from Rima San Giuseppe and reaches the summit passing through Vallarolo pass (2,332 m). Nearby the mountain, at 2,264 m, is located Rifugio Ferioli, a public mountain hut.

== Maps ==
- Italian official cartography (Istituto Geografico Militare - IGM); on-line version: www.pcn.minambiente.it
- Istituto Geografico Centrale - Carta dei sentieri e dei rifugi scala 1:50.000 n. 10 Monte Rosa, Alagna e Macugnaga
