= Lago di Rimasco =

Italian artificial lake

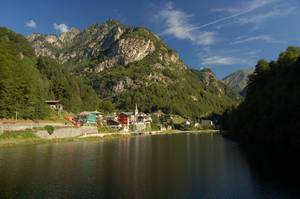

- Location within Piedmont
- Location: Province of Vercelli, Piedmont
- Coordinates: 45.856842°N 8.063986°E
- Basin countries: Italy

Lago di Rimasco is an artificial lake in the Province of Vercelli, Piedmont, Italy, situated in Rimasco, in the comune of Alto Sermenza in the Valsesia.
