= Walser people =

Speakers of the Walser German dialects

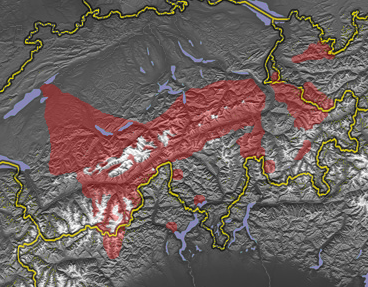
Distribution of Highest Alemannic dialects

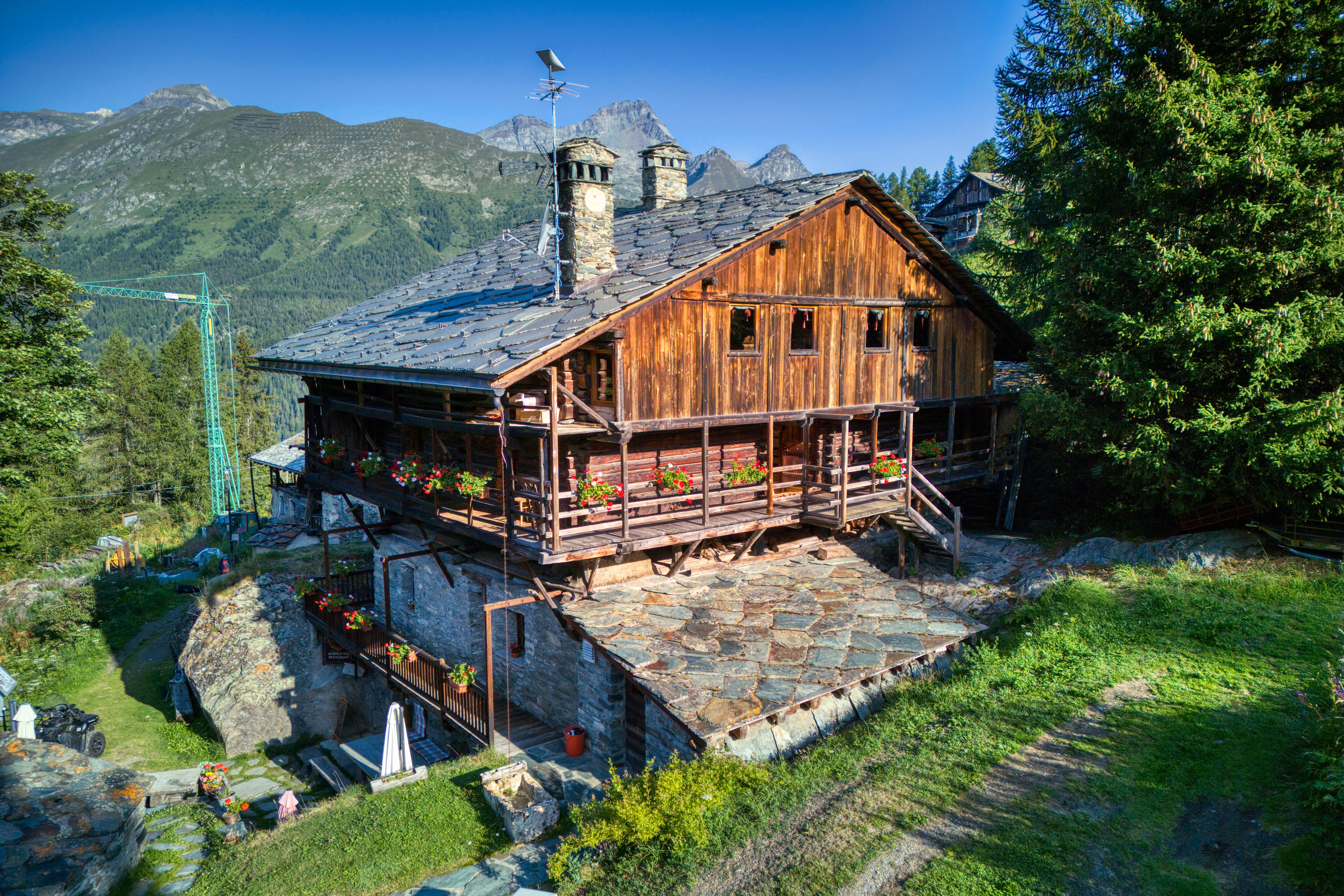
Walser House, Frantze, Antagnod, near Champoluc

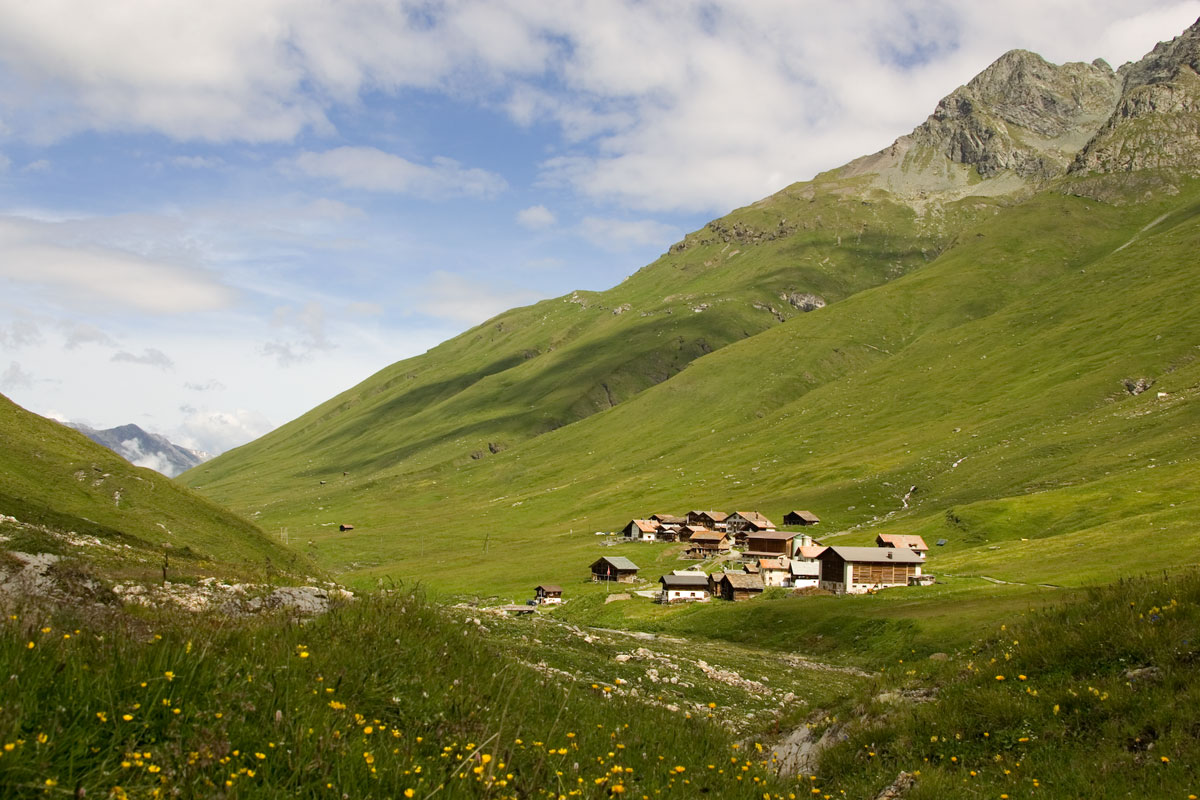
Juf (Avers), at 2,126 meters (6,975 ft) above sea level, is the highest permanently inhabited settlement in Europe. This Walser village was established in 1292 a few kilometers upstream of the Latin Val Ferrera.

The Walser people are the speakers of the Walser German dialects, a variety of Highest Alemannic. They inhabit the region of the Alps of Switzerland and Liechtenstein, as well as the fringes of Italy and Austria. The Walser people are named after the Wallis (Valais), the uppermost Rhône valley, where they settled from roughly the 10th century in the late phase of the migration of the Alamanni, crossing from the Bernese Oberland; because of linguistic differences among the Walser dialects, it is supposed that there were two independent immigration routes.

From the upper Wallis, they began to spread south, west and east between the 12th and 13th centuries, in the so-called Walser migrations (Walserwanderungen). The causes of these further population movements, the last wave of settlement in the higher valleys of the Alps, are not entirely clear. Some think that the large Walser migrations took place because of conflicts with the valley's feudal lords. Other theories contend it was because of overpopulation and yet others that they were reinforced by the respective local authorities in order to settle previously unpopulated regions. Starting in 1962, every three years a meeting of Walser people called Walsertreffen occurs in a Walser inhabited area.

== History ==
Flag of the Walser people

The Walser people originate from the Swiss canton of Valais. Around 1300, they started to migrate. As of 2022, the reasons are not historically documented; however, they are speculated to be due to overpopulation, climate change or poverty.

In many places Walser settlers received the "Walser right" (colonist right), that is, personal freedom, with the right to form their own judicial communities and the right of the free hereditary rights of land. When a settler died, the estate passed to his heirs. The "Walser law" was granted against a moderate interest and the obligation to serve in wartime.

== Geographical distribution ==
In Switzerland, the German-speaking part of the canton of Valais is the original region of the Walser. There are 26 Walser communities that were settled by the Walser migration (and seven others that originally were, but where Walser German is not spoken any more). These are: Simplon, in Canton of Valais; Bosco/Gurin, in Canton of Ticino; and the following communities in Graubünden (Grisons): Obersaxen; Valsertal (Vals, St. Martin); Safiental (Valendas, Versam, Tenna, Safien); Rheinwald (Medels, Nufenen, Splügen, Sufers, Hinterrhein, Avers); Schanfigg (Arosa, Langwies); Albula (Mutten, Schmitten, Wiesen); Landquart (Davos, Klosters, Furna, Says, St. Antönien, Valzeina). Wartau, (Matug, Walserberg, Palfris) and Walser speaking people may live in the canton of Geneva.

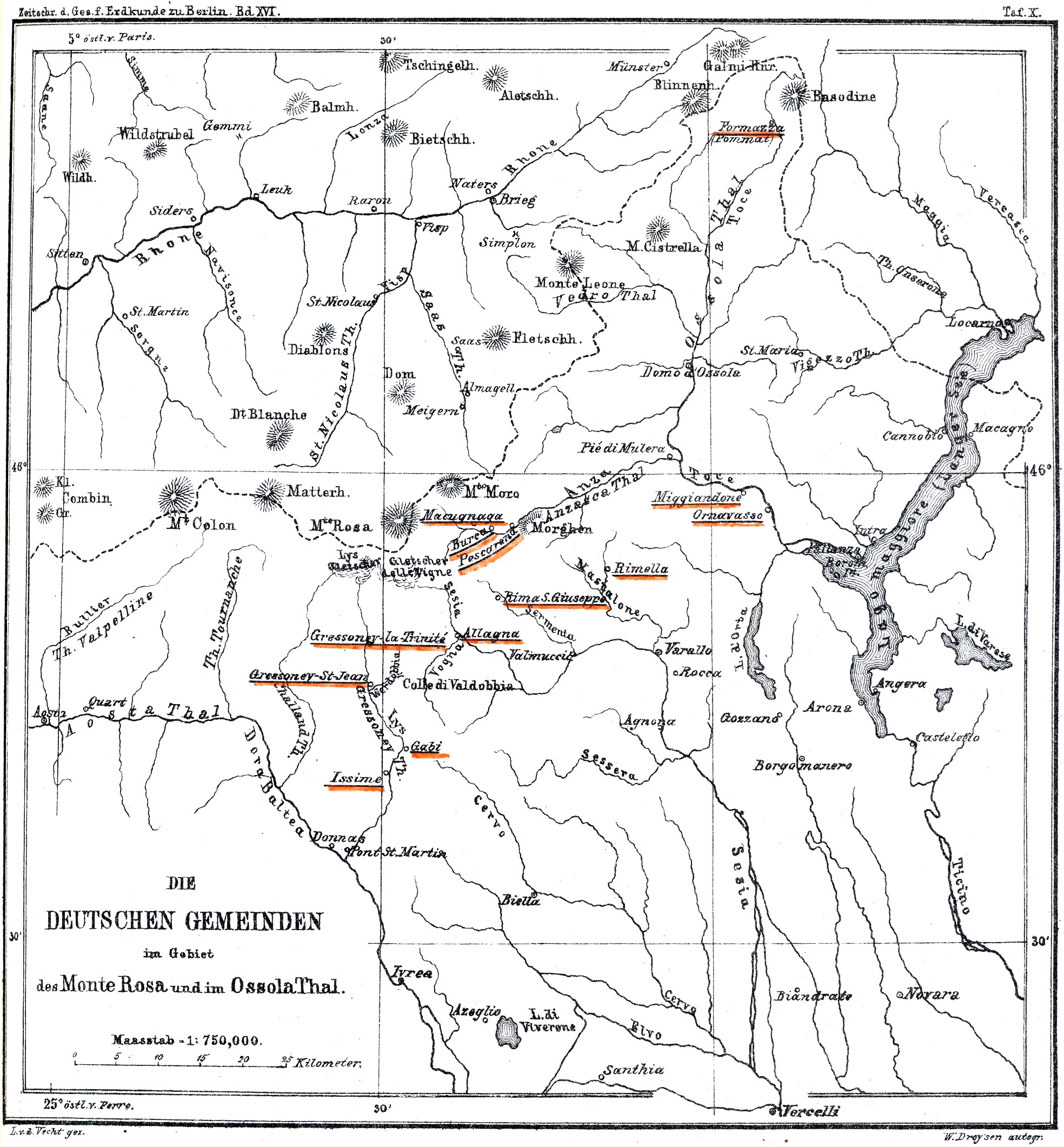
Walser settlements in northwestern Italy

In Italy, there are nine communities that were settled by the Walser migration (and four others that originally were, but where Walser German is not spoken any more (with exception of a few elders)). These are: Gressoney-La-Trinité, Gressoney-Saint-Jean and Issime (upper Lys Valley, in the Aosta Valley); Formazza, Macugnaga, Campello Monti (Verbano-Cusio-Ossola province); Alagna Valsesia, Riva Valdobbia, Carcoforo, Rimasco, Rima San Giuseppe, Rimella (Sesia Valley or Valsesia, in Vercelli province).

In Liechtenstein, there is one Walser community: Triesenberg, including Saminatal and Malbun. Until the 1930s, the dialects of Walser German and Romandy based on the French language was still spoken among a few hundred residents.

In Austria, there are 14 Walser communities: Grosses Walsertal (Blons, Fontanella, Raggal, St. Gerold, Sonntag, Thüringerberg), Kleinwalsertal (Mittelberg, a practical enclave of Germany), Brandnertal (Brand), Montafon (Silbertal), Reintal (Laterns), Tannberg (Schröcken, Lech, Warth), all in Vorarlberg; and in Paznauntal (Galtür), in Tyrol.

Additionally, Walser communities are reportedly found in Haute-Savoie, France (Vallorcine, in the Chablais), where the local Walser dialect is no longer spoken, and in the Berner Oberland (or Bernese Highlands), Switzerland (Grimseljoch-Sustenpass area, Lauterbrunnen, Mürren, etc.), where the local Walser dialect has assimilated to the (likewise Highest Alemannic) dialects of the Berner Oberland.

Some Walsers later settled portions of eastern Hungary, most were found in the Tokay wine region. Walsers, along with French Swiss speakers and French (Lorraine) vintners from the French with wine-producing skills arrived in the 19th century by invitation of the Austro-Hungarian Empire. Their descendants in the early 20th century were known as Français du Banat or the "Banat French", as well the Romandie de l'Ungerne or "the Romandies of Hungary".
