= 1954 Blons avalanches =

Natural disasters in Austria

Blons Avalanches 1954
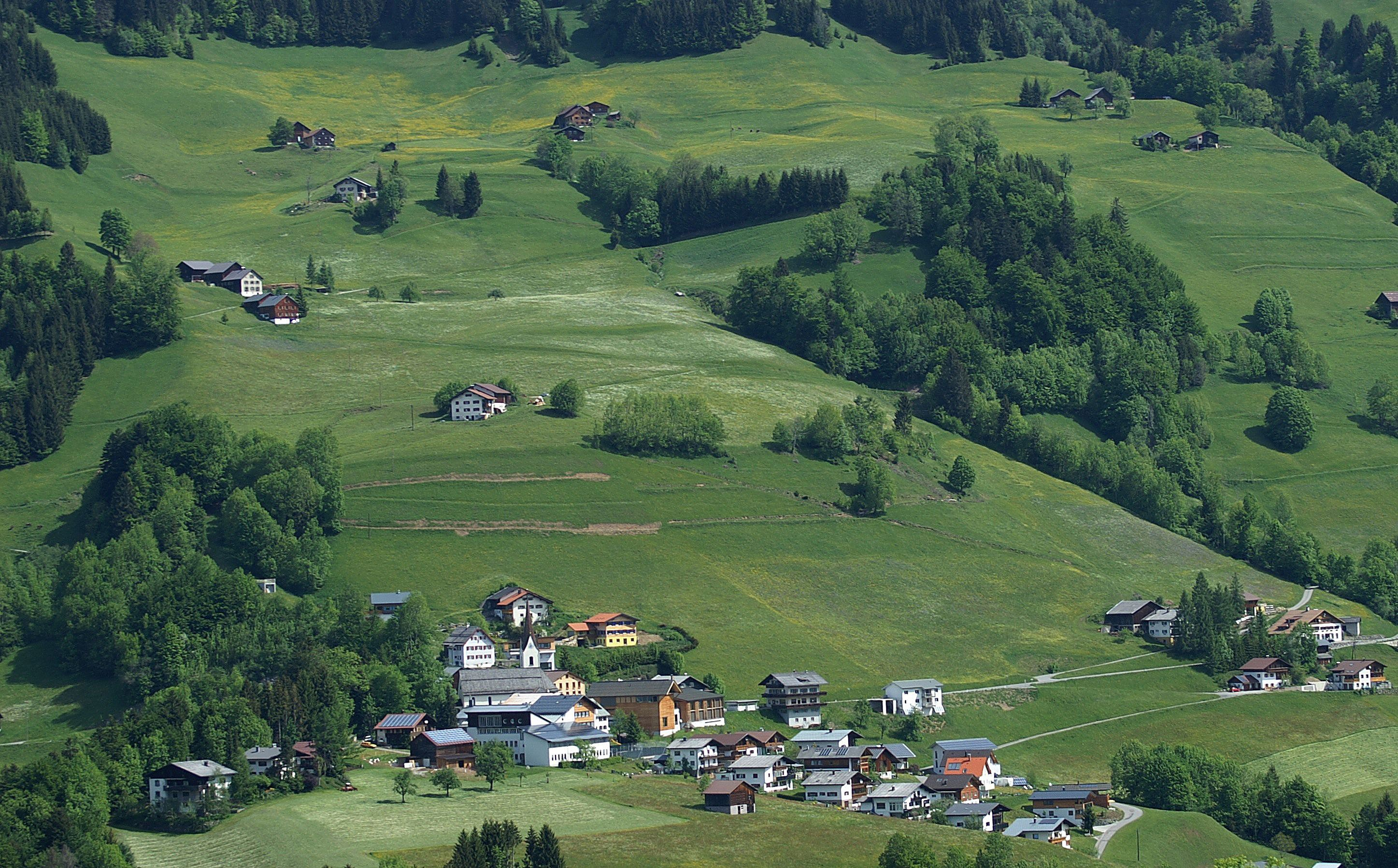
- Blons, Austria.
- Date: 11 January 1954
- Time: 9:36am and 7:00pm
- Location: Blons, Austria; 47.216°N 9.816°E
- Cause: Avalanches
- Deaths: 125

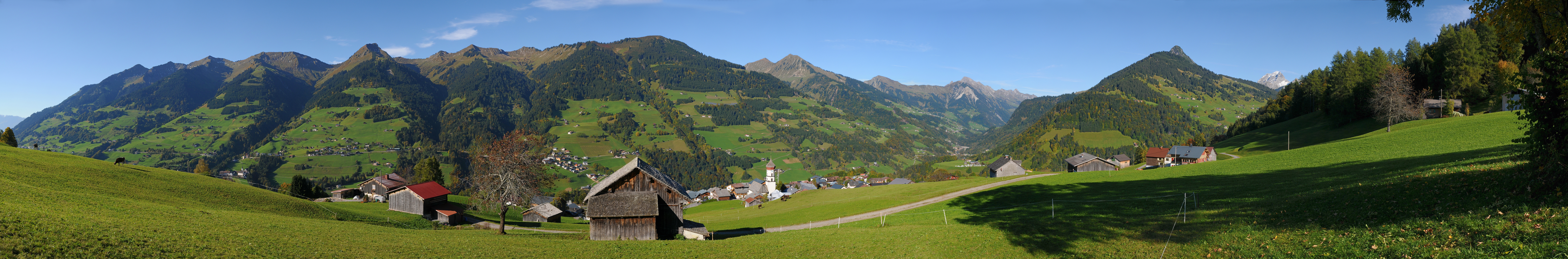
Alps in the Great Walser Valley region, Vorarlberg, Austria.

The Blons avalanches took place in Austria in January 1954. They occurred in the federal state of Vorarlberg, where they had a big impact on the Great Walser Valley region and specifically, the village of Blons. The avalanches occurred over a two-day period beginning from 11 January 1954 and resulted in the death of 125 people, 57 of whom were killed specifically in Blons. Two big avalanches struck Blons within 9 hours, the second of which buried rescue workers who were attempting to save civilians from the first avalanche. The avalanches caused much destruction to the Blons village, damaging one third of housing infrastructure and killing one third of the population. The Blons avalanches are considered to be one of the worst mass burials in Austrian history, resulting in one of the highest number of fatalities due to an avalanche.

== Geography ==
The village of Blons is located in the Bludenz district in the federal state of Vorarlberg, located on the western side of Austria. On its western side, the state of Vorarlberg borders with the European country Liechtenstein. Bludenz is a mountainous region with 525 mountains. In Vorarlberg there are 1315 avalanche catchment zones. The starting points of the Blons avalanches were Falvkopf and Mont-Calv. These peaks are situated approximately 6,500 ft high and surround the village. Falvkopf is 1849 meters above sea level. The coordinates of the Blons avalanche locations are Latitude: 47.2160 Longitude: 9.8160. The area of Blons is surrounded by rocks which are easily susceptible to erosion.

== The avalanches ==
On 11 January 1954 at 9:36am, the first avalanche began, starting at Flavkopf, where it struck the Blons village at 10:00am. The first avalanche struck the eastern side of the village, burying 82 people and killing 34 people. A second avalanche began later that night at 7:00pm starting at Mont-Calv. The second avalanche struck the centre of the village of Blons where 43 people were buried and 22 people died. Sixteen people who were rescued from the first avalanche were also later buried in the second avalanche. Both avalanches were classified as catastrophic. An avalanche classified at a catastrophic level means it has the potential to damage the surrounding landscape, the runout can cause damage and destruction to infrastructure in a valley and is large in size. On the morning the avalanche occurred, the local radio announced the avalanche warning system cautioned "the danger of avalanches has become extremely serious and is still increasing." A survivor, Robert Dobner, recounts the day as "a dark Monday, so full of snow."

== Rescue mission ==
The rescue response to the Blons avalanches was slow due to damaged power and telephone lines, which delayed rescuers hearing the news of the avalanches a day later. The rescue mission to save victims trapped from these avalanches led to the first airlift in Austrian history. Airlifts can quickly provide equipment and resources needed for a rescue mission site including transceivers, shovels and probes. Rescue dogs can also be used as they use their sense of smell to search for humans. The first Austrian responders started a rescue mission on 13 January 1954 and countries such as Germany, Switzerland and the United States also contributed to help rescue the civilians. The US Air Force provided 99 helicopters and 11,000 kg of rescue supplies while The Swiss Air-Rescue sent 14 rescuers, 6 rescue dogs, 2 helicopters, doctors and 5 rescue paratroopers. One of the main causes of death for victims impacted and trapped from an avalanche is asphyxia, which means people can still be alive while buried for a period of time and have the potential to survive. Some survivors of the Blons avalanches had been trapped for up to 17 to 62 hours. A Sydney Morning Herald article that reported on the Blons avalanches described the rescue crews as having to face a deep and narrow valley covered on both sides by tons of snow and that every capable man contribution to help. It also recounts that flares were used to help the rescue workers as the avalanches damaged lights as well as cutting off water supply and roads and rail communication.

== Aftermath ==
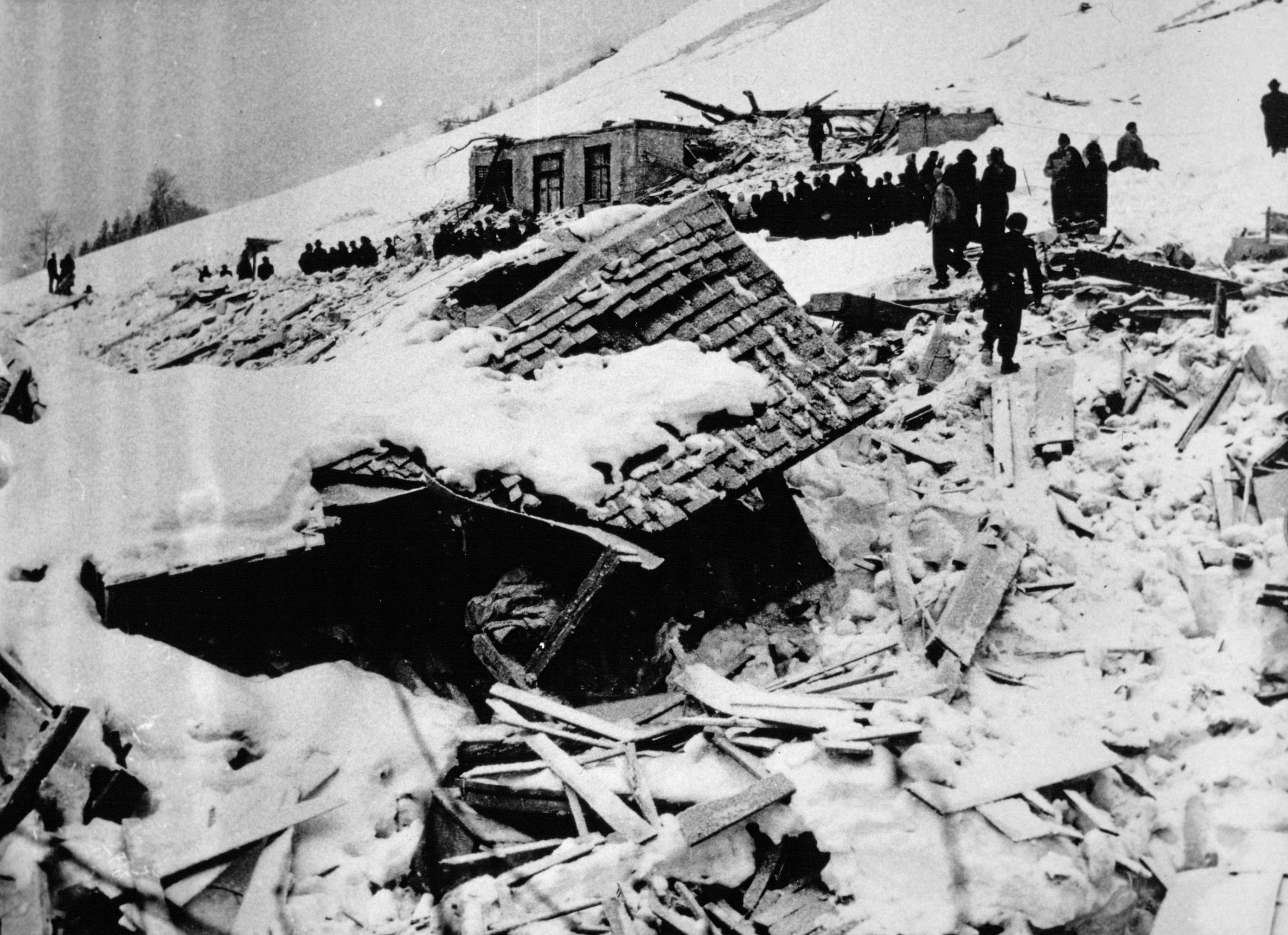
Damage from the avalanches in Blons 1954

The aftermath of the Blons avalanches resulted in "270 burials resulting in 125 deaths, 55 houses and hundreds of farm buildings [were] destroyed, and 500 cattle were killed." The population of Blons in 1954 had a total of 376 people and a third (111 people) were killed outright by the avalanches. Half of the men who worked at the Leduc mine in the area were also killed (Ruth, 1998; Davis, 2008). A third of the housing was also destroyed with 29 out of 90 homes in the village listed as demolished. Thirty-three victims were able to get to safety by themselves, 31 were rescued by rescue teams and 47 were found dead. One woman who was cooking in her home at the time the avalanche struck died from burns from coals in her oven that hit her on impact. Another man who had been found alive by a rescue crew after 17 hours, later died of shock after finding out how long he had been buried in the snow, as reported by wire service reports. Of the civilians found alive, 8 later died and 2 were not found.

== Cause ==
Austrian alps are always susceptible to natural hazards such as avalanches. In the lead up to the avalanches that targeted Blons, a combination of cold weather and a rapid increase in snowfall could not be sustained and was too much to hold. The heavy snowfall resulted in more than 2 meters in depth of snow in less than 24 hours. According to Holler (2009), two days prior to the first avalanche in the winter of January 1954, a "north westerly oriented frontal zone led to high new snow depth" particularly in Vorarlberg. Following the heavy snowfall, temperatures started to rise. After layers of snow accumulate and temperatures rise, snow cohesion can deteriorate and can cause an avalanche to release.

Prior to January 1954, the protection measures against avalanches in Blons were first established between 1906 and 1908. This included support structures of snow fences and walls of approximately 2 – 2.5 meters, which were destroyed during the 1954 avalanches and said to be inadequate. In the mountains above Blons the trees were also spread out resulting in low forest cover and therefore reduced protection coverage for the village. The civilians in the Blons village also took precautions to avoid the risk of an avalanche to surrounding areas. As winter approached, councilmen in Blons would remove a crucifix that was placed in a high-risk area to avoid any damage to it. At a particular ravine in Blons, the civilians would stop talking and walk in a single line spread apart when crossing a bridge. This was done to avoid their voices causing vibrations in the area that could start an avalanche and if one was to release, they believed being spread apart would reduce the number of them taken by it.

== Response ==
The Blons avalanches in Austria in 1954 have "heralded modern avalanche protection in the alps." Due to the high impact of these avalanches, along with others in Austria, measures have been put in place to protect the Blons village in Vorarlberg from potential avalanche threat in the future.‘Catastrophic’ level avalanches have since decreased in Austria due to improved protection measures overall.

Comprehensive investigation into forest cover and tree quality has been undertaken in the mountains above Blons in order to improve its effectiveness in protection against avalanches. The ‘Forest Engineering Service for Torrent and Avalanche Control’ is in charge of enforcing protection measures against natural hazards in Austria. Since the Blons avalanches, there is much more forest cover compared to the coverage in 1954, due to extensive reforestation efforts. In 1971 there was 520 hectares of forest coverage and by 2009 it had increased to 601 hectares of coverage. Forest coverage can help improve protection against avalanches as it can slow down the speed of the snow and reduce the runout distance. In the Blons area approximately half a million trees have been planted, four fifths of which are Picea abies. This abies tree species is effective in avalanche protection due its capability in ensuring stabilisation because of its deep root system that can reach a depth of up to 2 metres. At the main starting points of avalanches in Blons, approximately 6.5 kilometres of defence mechanisms have since been put in place including steel snow bridges, hangings and steel-wood construction as well as 315 creeping snow constructions and 745 metres worth of wind drift barriers.

Studies of the Blons avalanches have helped to improve the knowledge and understanding of avalanche cycles in Austria, which in turn have helped result in more efficient forecasting of avalanches. A study has revealed that of the biggest avalanches in Austrian history "about two-thirds [of the avalanches] occurred as a result of a north-westerly oriented frontal zone." It also found that higher levels of snowfall played a large contributing role in the cause of these ‘catastrophic’ avalanches. The study was able to deduce that certain weather situations are related to the avalanche cycles and patterns occurring in Austria and has helped better predict when an avalanche might be expected. Avalanche warning systems are also now available online. The ‘European Avalanche Warning Services’ aims to provide "society with efficient and effective avalanche forecasting and warning services" and can inform and warn people of any potential avalanche risks in areas all across Europe, including Blons. Avalanche detection has been developed which looks at features such as infrasound, seismic and radar signals. Modern avalanche simulation technology has also been made, which makes it possible to simulate potential hazardous scenarios in high risk avalanche hazard-zones and detect where there may be protection measures against avalanches. In regard to the Blons avalanches, this technology was able to help highlight the lack of defensive constructions at the starting points of each of the avalanches that released.

In terms of avalanche rescue strategies, there has been little change since the Blons avalanches. Approximately 50% of people do not carry avalanche transceivers. If they were to be buried by an avalanche original tools and strategies are still in use to rescue buried victims.

== In the Media ==
Several books and films have been produced which have recounted the experience of those involved. The book titled "Avalanche!" written by author Joseph Wechsberg in 1958 provides coverage on the events of the Blons avalanches, civilians stories, the impact it had on the whole community and the rehabilitation efforts the community has adopted. He describes the events as "no other recorded avalanche in modern history has done so much to so many in so short a time and so small a place." The film and novel called "Der Atem des Himmels" is also based on the 1954 avalanches in Blons. It depicts the build-up and how the events of the avalanches unfolded. The incident of the avalanches is also featured in the documentary series "Disasters of the Century" in season 4, episode 9 which includes personal recounts from residents of Blons at the time, what they experienced as well as reenactments. An avalanche documentation centre in Blons exhibits facts and photographs about the events that occurred during the 1954 avalanches and what protection measures have been put in place to increase safety to the area.
