= Rima San Giuseppe =

- Frazione
- Traditional rural houses

- Location of Rima San Giuseppe in Italy
- Coordinates: 45°53′N 8°0′E
- Country: Italy
- Region: Piedmont
- Province: Vercelli (VC)
- Comune: Alto Sermenza

Area
  - Total: 36.2 km^{2} (14.0 sq mi)
- Elevation: 975 m (3,199 ft)

Population (31 December 2010)
  - Total: 69
  - Density: 1.9/km^{2} (4.9/sq mi)
- Demonym: Rimesi
- Time zone: UTC+1 (CET)
  - Summer (DST): UTC+2 (CEST)
- Postal code: 13020
- Dialing code: 0163

Rima San Giuseppe (Piedmontese: Rima, Walser German: Arimmu or In d Rimmu) is a frazione of Alto Sermenza in the Province of Vercelli in the Italian region Piedmont, located about 90 kilometres (56 mi) north of Turin and about 70 kilometres (43 mi) northwest of Vercelli.

== History ==
Rima, the biggest settlement in the area, was created in the XIV Century by Walser settlers.

In the second half of the XIX Century the local artists and artisans became famous in European courts, including that of the Habsburgs and that of the Romanov. The wealth derived by the requests of European courts led to a period of economic growth and led to widespread enrichment in the towns of the area, which, in turn, led to the rise of an elegant architecture in the town of Rima.

The coat of arms and the banner of Rima San Giuseppe were granted by decree of the President of the Italy on 10 July 1960. The coat of arm was adopted as to represent the area which at the time was an Italian comune. However, on 1 January 2018, the comune of Rima San Giuseppe and the comune of Rimasco were merged to form the new comune of Alto Sermenza.
