= Alto Sermenza =

- Comune
- Comune di Alto Sermenza
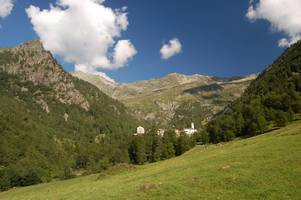

- Location within Italy Location within Piedmont
- Coordinates: 45°52′N 8°04′E
- Country: Italy
- Region: Piedmont
- Province: Vercelli (VC)
- Frazioni: Rimasco, Rima San Giuseppe

Government
  - Mayor: Giuliana Marone

Area
  - Total: 60.33 km^{2} (23.29 sq mi)
- Elevation: 906 m (2,972 ft)

Population (31 December 2016)
  - Total: 160
  - Density: 2.7/km^{2} (6.9/sq mi)
- Time zone: UTC+1 (CET)
  - Summer (DST): UTC+2 (CEST)
- Postal code: 13026
- Dialing code: 0163
- Website: Official website

Alto Sermenza is a comune (municipality) in the Province of Vercelli in the Italian region Piedmont, established on 1 January 2018 by the merger of the Rima San Giuseppe and Rimasco, in Valsesia.
