= Fontanella, Austria =

Fontanella
- Municipality
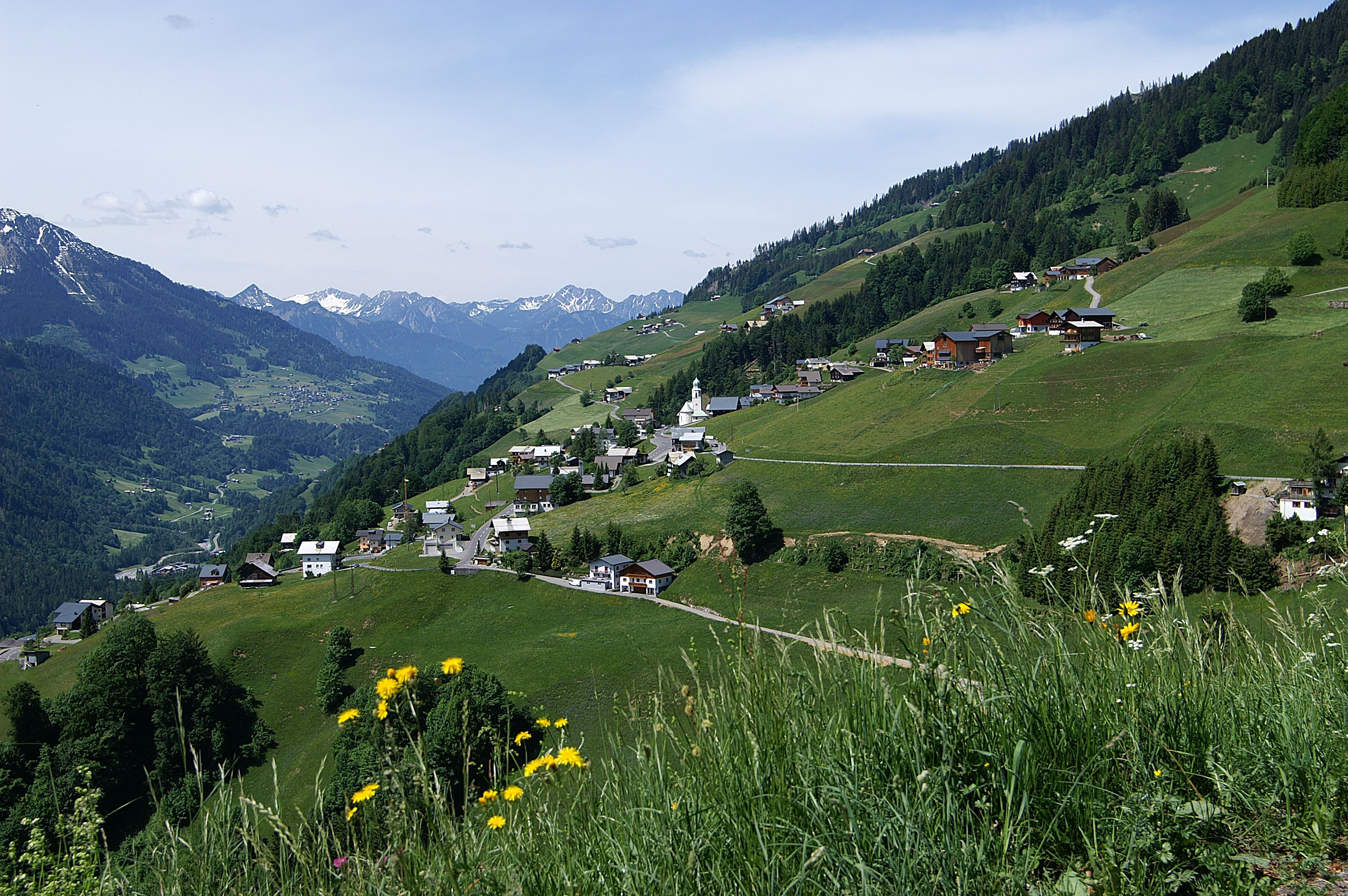

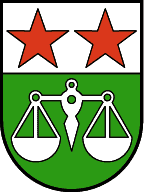
- Coat of arms

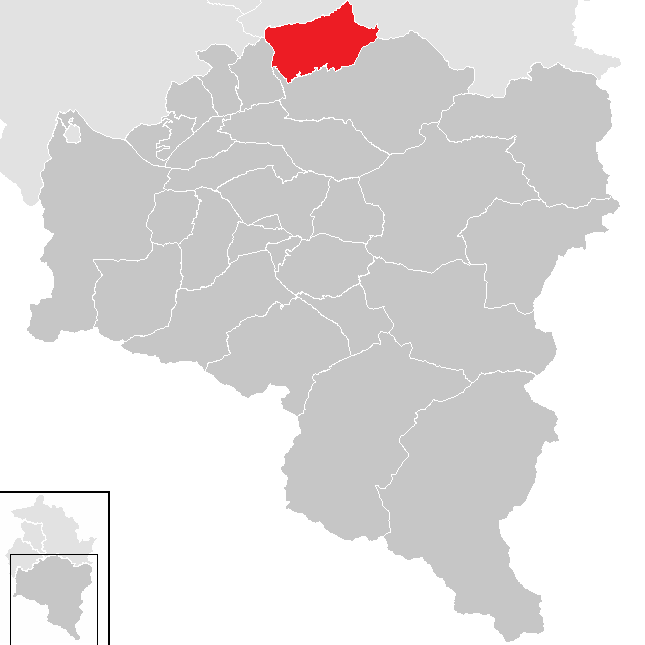
- Location in the district

- Location within Austria
- Coordinates: 47°14′51″N 09°54′33″E
- Country: Austria
- State: Vorarlberg
- District: Bludenz

Government
  - Mayor: Werner Konzett (ÖVP)

Area
  - Total: 31.24 km^{2} (12.06 sq mi)
- Elevation: 1,145 m (3,757 ft)

Population (2018-01-01)
  - Total: 437
  - Density: 14.0/km^{2} (36.2/sq mi)
- Time zone: UTC+1 (CET)
  - Summer (DST): UTC+2 (CEST)
- Postal code: 6733
- Area code: 05554
- Vehicle registration: BZ
- Website: www.fontanella.at

Fontanella is a municipality in the Austrian state of Vorarlberg.

== Geography ==
About 29.5% of the municipality is forested, and 52.1% is alpine.

=== Subdivisions ===
The municipality consists of the villages Fontanella, Garlitt, Mittelberg, Türtsch, Kirchberg, Seewald and Faschina.

== Economy ==
There are 18 companies. 102 persons are employed. In the tourism year 2001/2002 there were a total of 70,365 nights.

== Population ==
Historical population
Year	Pop.	±%
1869	456	—
1880	356	−21.9%
1890	344	−3.4%
1900	341	−0.9%
1910	352	+3.2%
1923	296	−15.9%
1934	354	+19.6%
1939	397	+12.1%
1951	370	−6.8%
1961	366	−1.1%
1971	402	+9.8%
1981	401	−0.2%
1991	422	+5.2%
2001	473	+12.1%
2011	434	−8.2%

== History ==
Fontanella was founded by Walser settlers from Valais in the 14th century. It was occupied by France from 1945 to 1955.
