= Raggal =

- Municipality
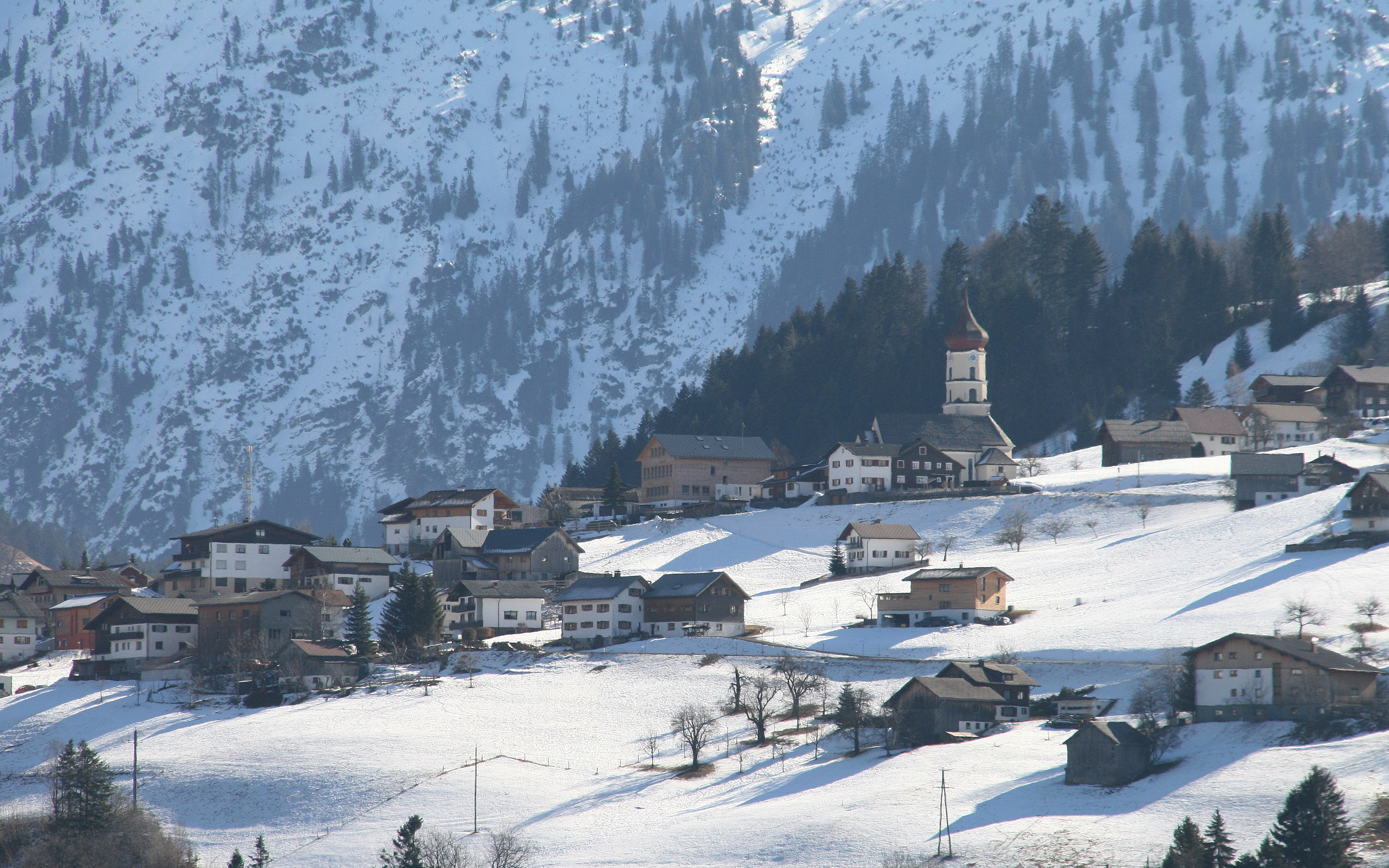

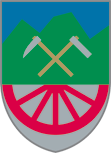
- Coat of arms

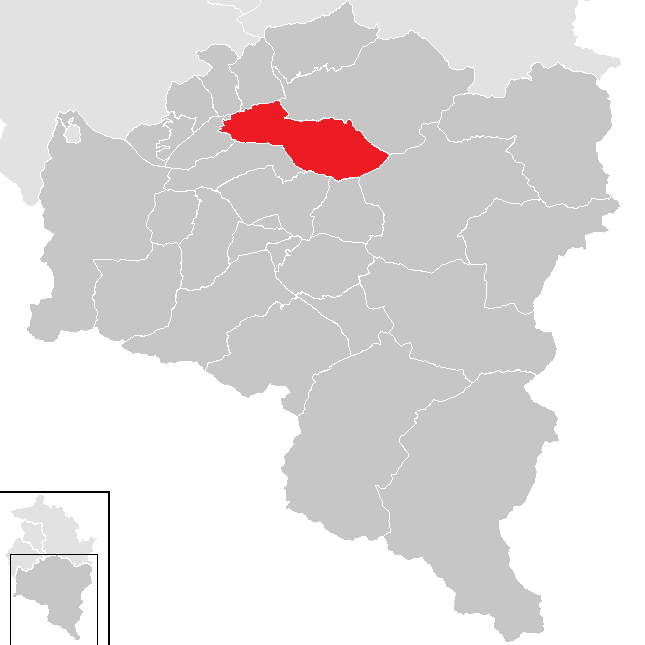
- Location in the district

- Location within Austria
- Coordinates: 47°13′00″N 09°49′00″E
- Country: Austria
- State: Vorarlberg
- District: Bludenz

Government
  - Mayor: Hermann Manahl

Area
  - Total: 41.69 km^{2} (16.10 sq mi)
- Elevation: 1,015 m (3,330 ft)

Population (2018-01-01)
  - Total: 868
  - Density: 20.8/km^{2} (53.9/sq mi)
- Time zone: UTC+1 (CET)
  - Summer (DST): UTC+2 (CEST)
- Postal code: 6741
- Area code: 05553
- Vehicle registration: BZ
- Website: www.raggal.at

Raggal is a municipality in the district of Bludenz in the Austrian state of Vorarlberg.

== Population ==
Historical population
Year	Pop.	±%
1869	761	—
1880	651	−14.5%
1890	536	−17.7%
1900	512	−4.5%
1910	508	−0.8%
1923	512	+0.8%
1934	546	+6.6%
1939	570	+4.4%
1951	618	+8.4%
1961	612	−1.0%
1971	695	+13.6%
1981	744	+7.1%
1991	810	+8.9%
2001	863	+6.5%
2011	832	−3.6%
