= Thüringerberg =

- Municipality
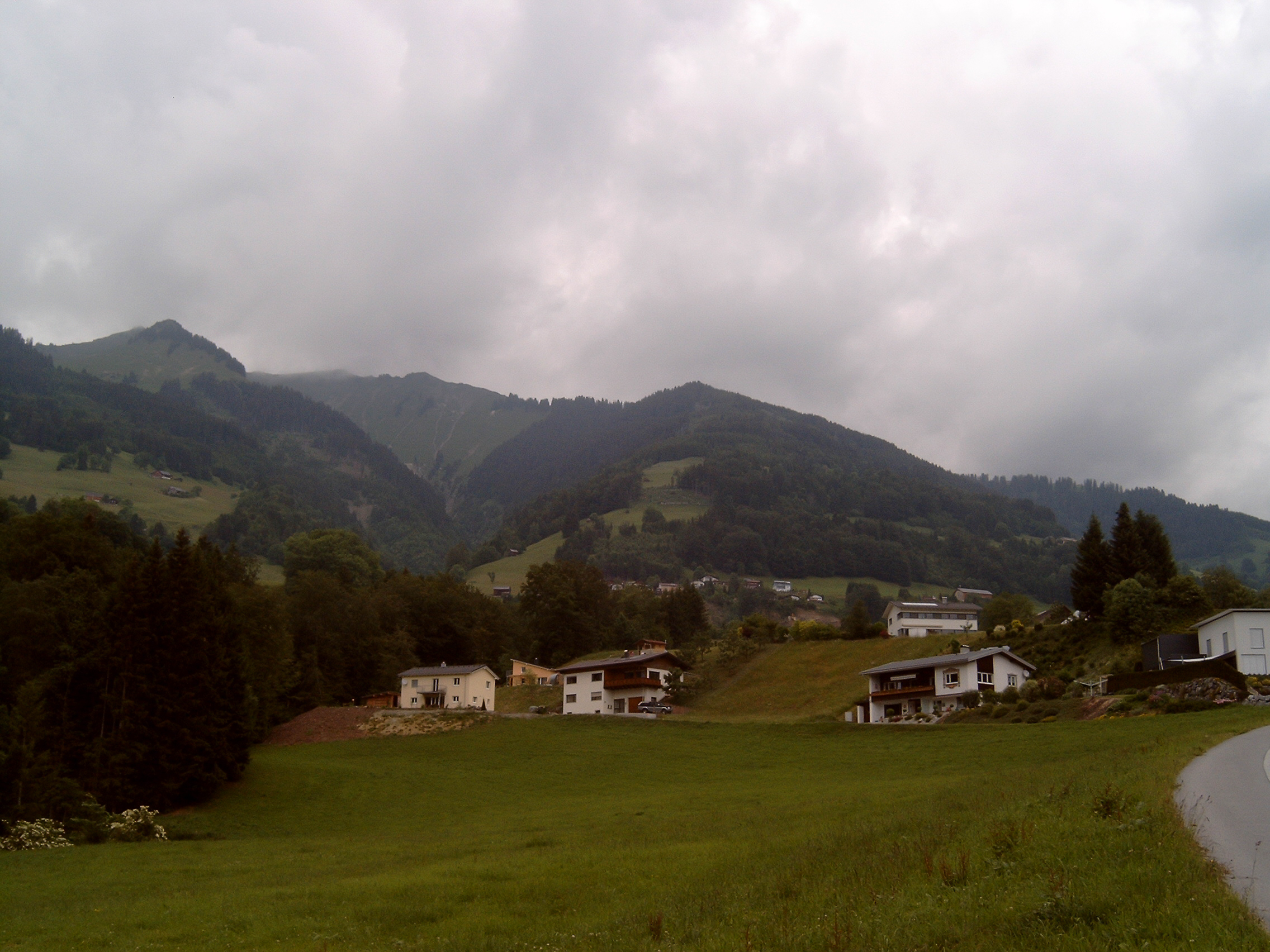

- Coat of arms

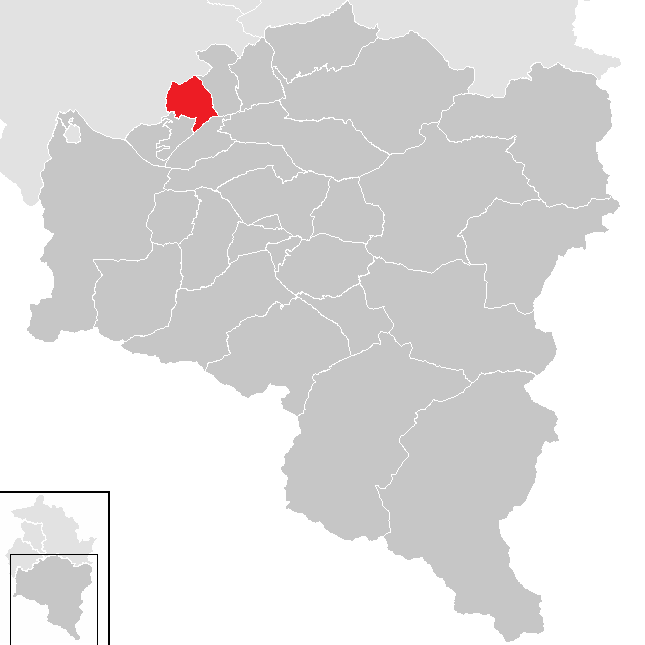
- Location in the district

- Location within Austria
- Coordinates: 47°12′54″N 09°46′59″E
- Country: Austria
- State: Vorarlberg
- District: Bludenz

Government
  - Mayor: Wilhelm Müller

Area
  - Total: 10.4 km^{2} (4.0 sq mi)
- Elevation: 877 m (2,877 ft)

Population (2018-01-01)
  - Total: 714
  - Density: 68.7/km^{2} (178/sq mi)
- Time zone: UTC+1 (CET)
  - Summer (DST): UTC+2 (CEST)
- Postal code: 6721
- Area code: 05550
- Vehicle registration: BZ
- Website: www.thueringerberg.at

Thüringerberg is a municipality in the district of Bludenz in the Austrian state of Vorarlberg.

== Population ==
Historical population
Year	Pop.	±%
1869	325	—
1880	309	−4.9%
1890	395	+27.8%
1900	282	−28.6%
1910	309	+9.6%
1923	344	+11.3%
1934	350	+1.7%
1939	379	+8.3%
1951	411	+8.4%
1961	432	+5.1%
1971	478	+10.6%
1981	562	+17.6%
1991	653	+16.2%
2001	667	+2.1%
2011	681	+2.1%
