= Sonntag, Austria =

Sonntag
- Municipality
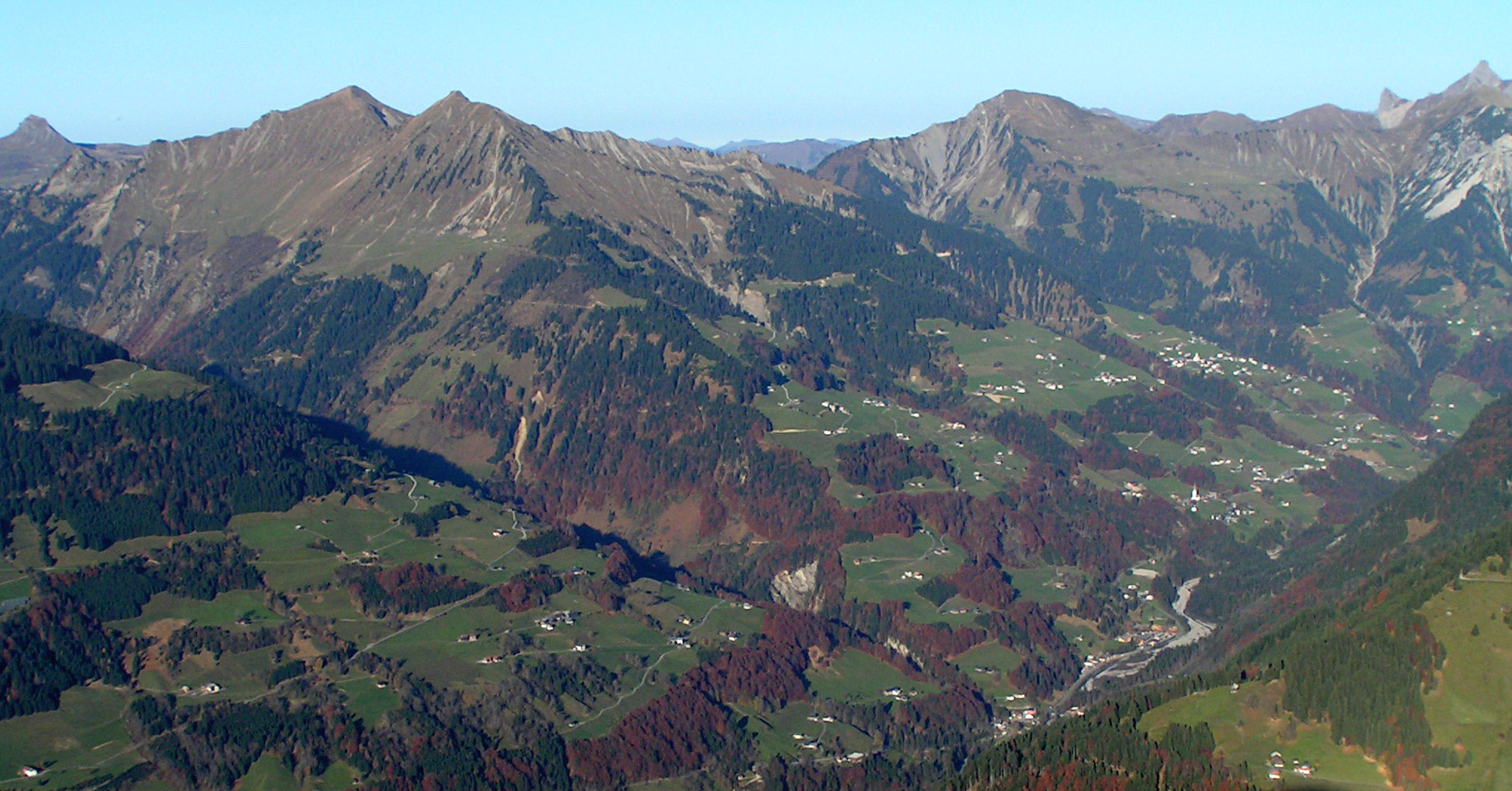

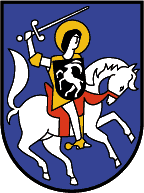
- Coat of arms

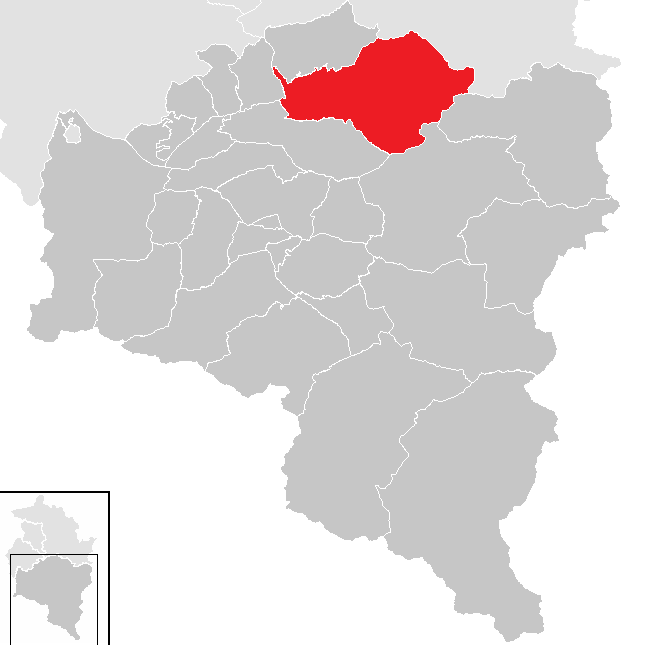
- Location in the district

- Location within Austria
- Coordinates: 47°14′21″N 09°54′05″E
- Country: Austria
- State: Vorarlberg
- District: Bludenz

Government
  - Mayor: Franz Ferdinand Türtscher

Area
  - Total: 81.58 km^{2} (31.50 sq mi)
- Elevation: 888 m (2,913 ft)

Population (2018-01-01)
  - Total: 671
  - Density: 8.23/km^{2} (21.3/sq mi)
- Time zone: UTC+1 (CET)
  - Summer (DST): UTC+2 (CEST)
- Postal code: 6731
- Area code: 05554
- Vehicle registration: BZ
- Website: www.tiscover.at/sonntag

Sonntag is a municipality in the district of Bludenz in the Austrian state of Vorarlberg.

== Population ==
Historical population
| Year | Pop. | ±% |
|---|---|---|
| 1869 | 795 | — |
| 1880 | 719 | −9.6% |
| 1890 | 723 | +0.6% |
| 1900 | 623 | −13.8% |
| 1910 | 661 | +6.1% |
| 1923 | 684 | +3.5% |
| 1934 | 728 | +6.4% |
| 1939 | 678 | −6.9% |
| 1951 | 753 | +11.1% |
| 1961 | 686 | −8.9% |
| 1971 | 656 | −4.4% |
| 1981 | 647 | −1.4% |
| 1991 | 724 | +11.9% |
| 2001 | 723 | −0.1% |
| 2011 | 686 | −5.1% |
