= Blons =

- Municipality
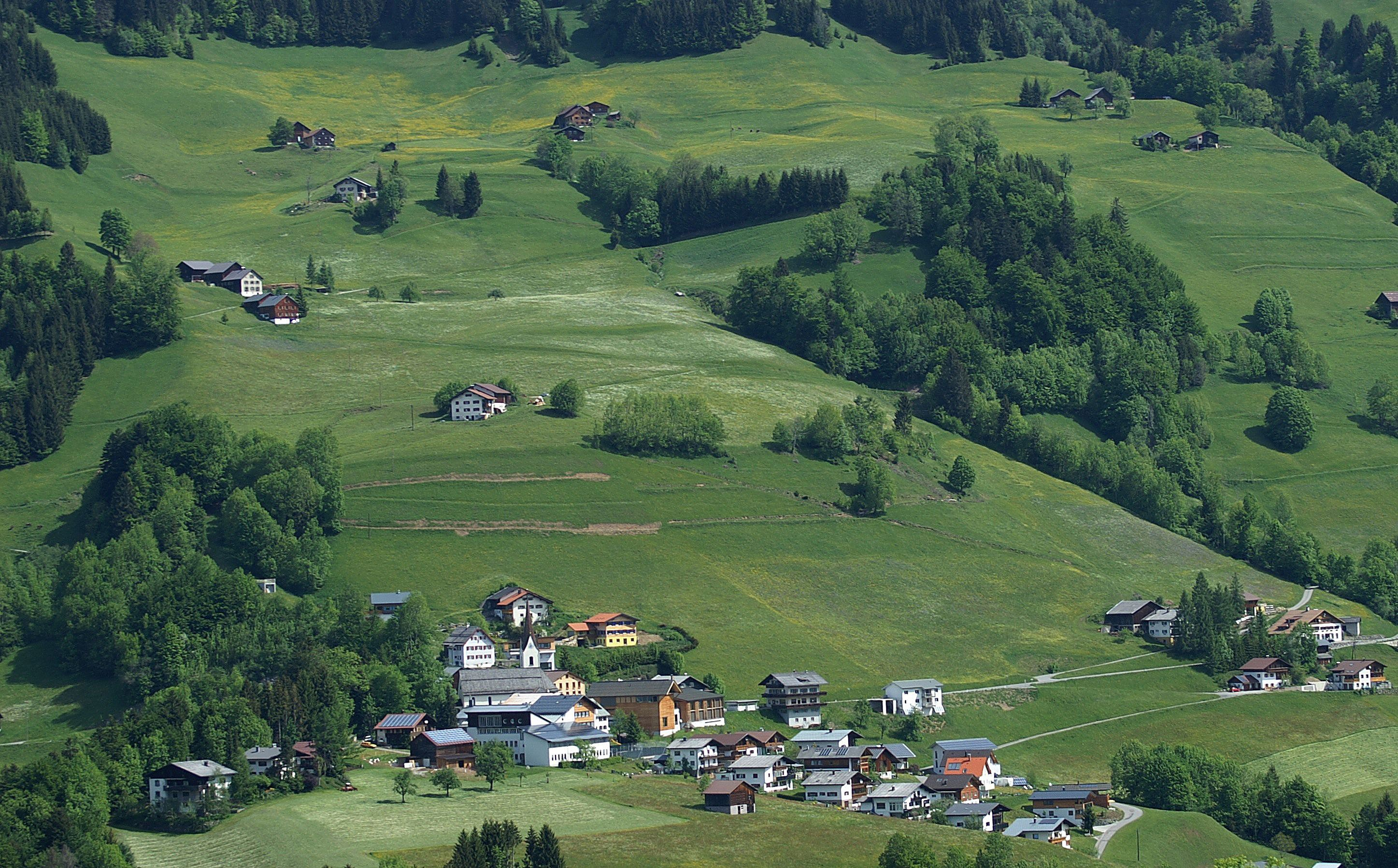

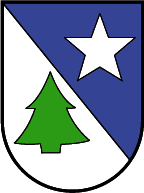
- Coat of arms

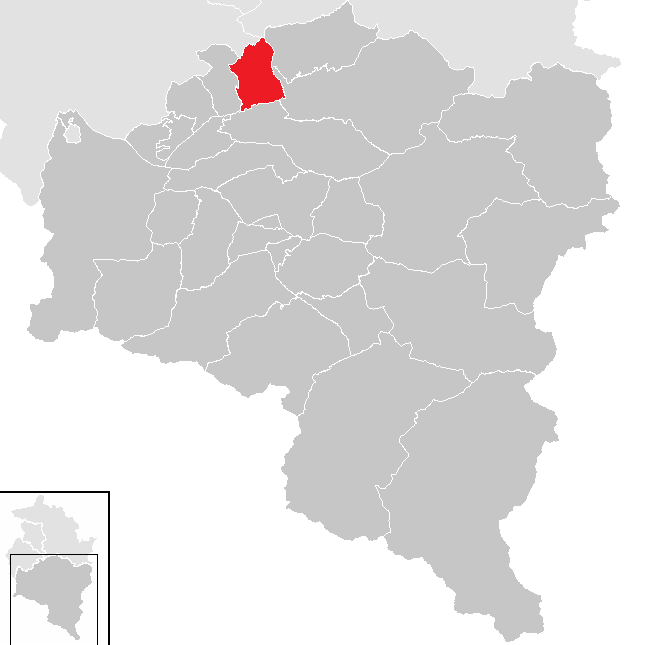
- Location in the district

- Location within Austria
- Coordinates: 47°13′00″N 09°49′00″E
- Country: Austria
- State: Vorarlberg
- District: Bludenz

Government
  - Mayor: Stefan Bachmann

Area
  - Total: 14.87 km^{2} (5.74 sq mi)
- Elevation: 903 m (2,963 ft)

Population (2018-01-01)
  - Total: 349
  - Density: 23.5/km^{2} (60.8/sq mi)
- Time zone: UTC+1 (CET)
  - Summer (DST): UTC+2 (CEST)
- Postal code: 6723
- Area code: 05553
- Vehicle registration: BZ
- Website: www.blons.at

Blons is a municipality in the district of Bludenz in Austrian state of Vorarlberg.

== Population ==
Historical population
Year	Pop.	±%
1869	335	—
1880	323	−3.6%
1890	285	−11.8%
1900	302	+6.0%
1910	313	+3.6%
1923	350	+11.8%
1934	380	+8.6%
1939	384	+1.1%
1951	385	+0.3%
1961	249	−35.3%
1971	297	+19.3%
1981	302	+1.7%
1991	318	+5.3%
2001	335	+5.3%
2011	329	−1.8%

== See also ==
- 1954 Blons avalanches
