= Rimasco =

- Frazione
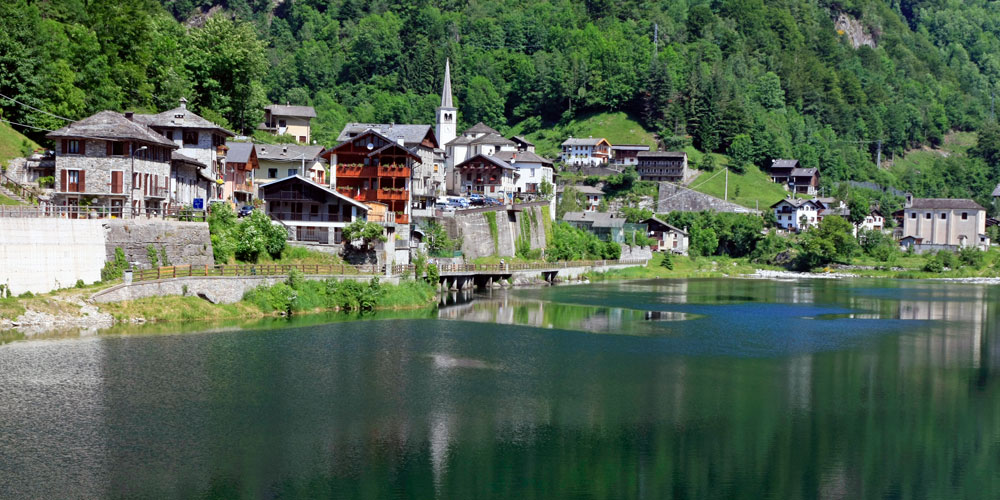

- Location of Rimasco in Italy
- Coordinates: 45°52′N 8°4′E
- Country: Italy
- Region: Piedmont
- Province: Vercelli (VC)
- Comune: Alto Sermenza

Area
  - Total: 24.4 km^{2} (9.4 sq mi)

Population (Dec. 2004)
  - Total: 150
  - Density: 6.1/km^{2} (16/sq mi)
- Time zone: UTC+1 (CET)
  - Summer (DST): UTC+2 (CEST)
- Postal code: 13026
- Dialing code: 0163

Rimasco is a frazione of Alto Sermenza in the Province of Vercelli in the Italian region Piedmont, located about 90 kilometres (56 mi) northeast of Turin and about 70 kilometres (43 mi) northwest of Vercelli.
