= Sankt Gerold =

- Municipality
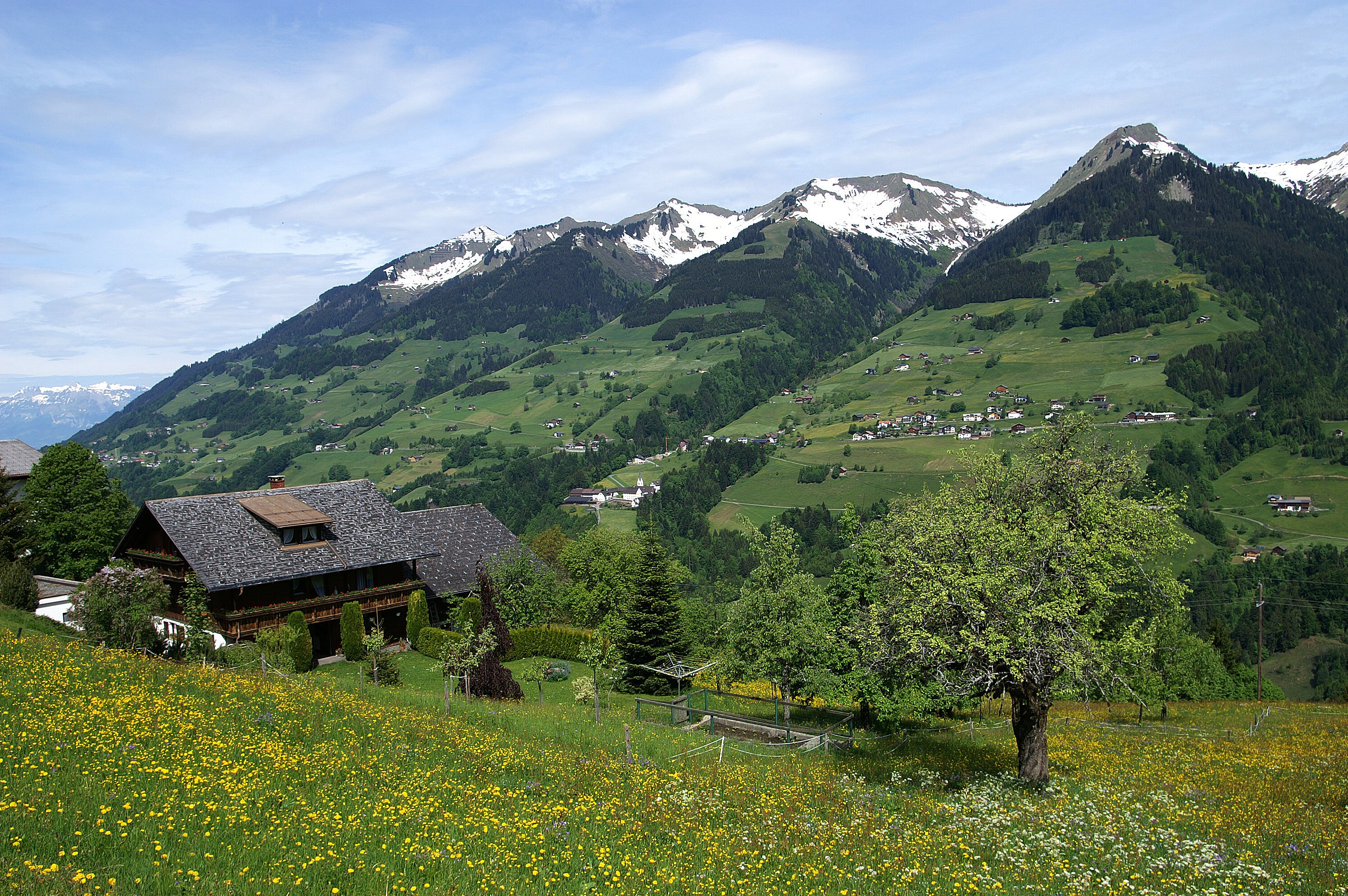

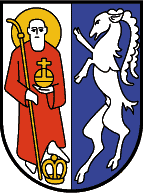
- Coat of arms

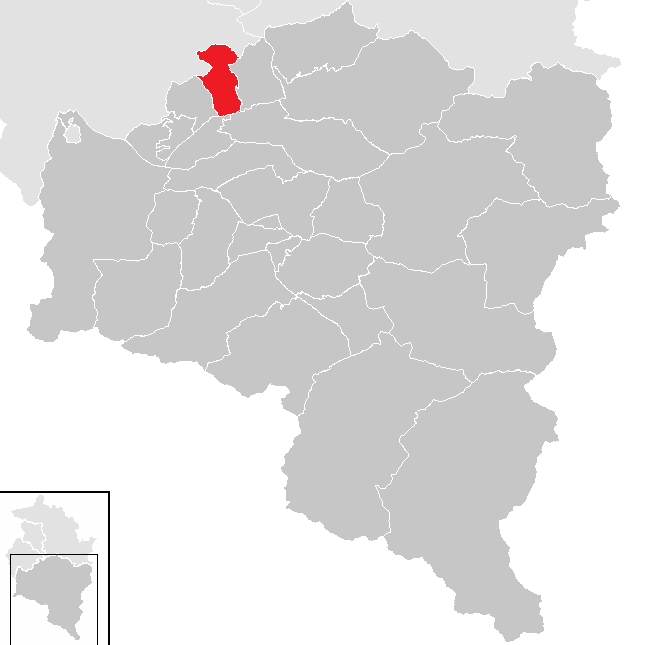
- Location in the district

- Location within Austria
- Coordinates: 47°13′17″N 09°49′11″E
- Country: Austria
- State: Vorarlberg
- District: Bludenz

Government
  - Mayor: Alwin Müller

Area
  - Total: 12.58 km^{2} (4.86 sq mi)
- Elevation: 920 m (3,020 ft)

Population (2018-01-01)
  - Total: 410
  - Density: 33/km^{2} (84/sq mi)
- Time zone: UTC+1 (CET)
  - Summer (DST): UTC+2 (CEST)
- Postal code: 6722
- Area code: 05550
- Vehicle registration: BZ
- Website: www.st-gerold.at

Sankt Gerold (German pronunciation: [ˌzaŋkt ˈɡeːʁɔlt]) is a municipality in the district of Bludenz in the Austrian state of Vorarlberg.

== Population ==
Historical population
Year	Pop.	±%
1869	275	—
1880	249	−9.5%
1890	194	−22.1%
1900	209	+7.7%
1910	229	+9.6%
1923	235	+2.6%
1934	278	+18.3%
1939	244	−12.2%
1951	282	+15.6%
1961	308	+9.2%
1971	282	−8.4%
1981	321	+13.8%
1991	329	+2.5%
2001	385	+17.0%
2011	365	−5.2%
