= Vorarlberg =

State of Austria

- State
- Federal State of Vorarlberg; Bundesland Vorarlberg (German); Bundesland Vorarlbearg (Alemannic German)
- Flag Coat of arms Brandmark
- Anthem: " 's Ländle, meine Heimat"
- Coordinates: 47°14′37″N 9°53′38″E
- Country: Austria
- Capital: Bregenz

Government
  - Body: Landtag of Vorarlberg
  - Governor: Markus Wallner (ÖVP)
  - Deputy Governor: Christof Bitschi

Area
  - Total: 2,533.84 km^{2} (978.32 sq mi)

Population (1 January 2022)
  - Total: 401,674
  - Density: 158.524/km^{2} (410.575/sq mi)

GDP
  - Total: €23.214 billion (2024)
  - Per capita: €56,482 (2024)
- Time zone: UTC+1 (CET)
  - Summer (DST): UTC+2 (CEST)
- ISO 3166 code: AT-8
- HDI (2022): 0.917 very high · 6th of 9
- NUTS Region: AT3
- Votes in Bundesrat: 3 (of 62)
- Website: vorarlberg.at

Vorarlberg (/ˈfɔːrɑːrlbɜːrɡ/ FOR-arl-burg; Austrian German: [foːɐ̯ˈarlbɛrɡ]; Vorarlbergisch: Vorarlbearg, Voralbärg, or Voraadelbearg) is the westernmost state (Land) of Austria. It has the second-smallest geographical area after Vienna and, although it also has the second-smallest population, it is the state with the second-highest population density (also after Vienna). It borders three countries: Germany (Bavaria and Baden-Württemberg via Lake Constance), Switzerland (Grisons and St. Gallen), and Liechtenstein. The only Austrian state that shares a border with Vorarlberg is Tyrol, to the east.

The capital of Vorarlberg is Bregenz (29,698 inhabitants), although Dornbirn (49,845 inhabitants) and Feldkirch (34,192 inhabitants) have larger populations. Vorarlberg is also the only state in Austria where the local dialect is not Austro-Bavarian, but rather an Alemannic dialect; it therefore has much more in common culturally with (historically) Alemannic-speaking German-speaking Switzerland, Liechtenstein, Baden-Württemberg, Bavarian Swabia, and Alsace than with the rest of Austria, southeastern Bavaria, and South Tyrol.

Vorarlberg is to a large extent mountainous, and two-thirds of the state is situated above 1,000m elevation. About 37% (97,000 hectares or 240,000 acres) of its surface is forest.

== Etymology ==
Vorarlberg literally means 'in front of the Arlberg', which is a mountain in the region. The name Arl or Arlberg can be traced back to 1218 in various spellings (Arle, Arlen, Mons Arula, Arlenperge) and is believed to be derived from the Arlen bushes there, the so-called mountain pines.

Its nickname is Ländle ('small land'). The frame of reference for this was the much larger and more populous County of Tyrol, from which the small district west of the Arlberg tried to detach itself. In 1861, Vorarlberg was finally raised to a crown land, with its own state parliament. On the way to the detachment from Tyrol, the identification with the Ländle remained of great importance.

== Geography ==
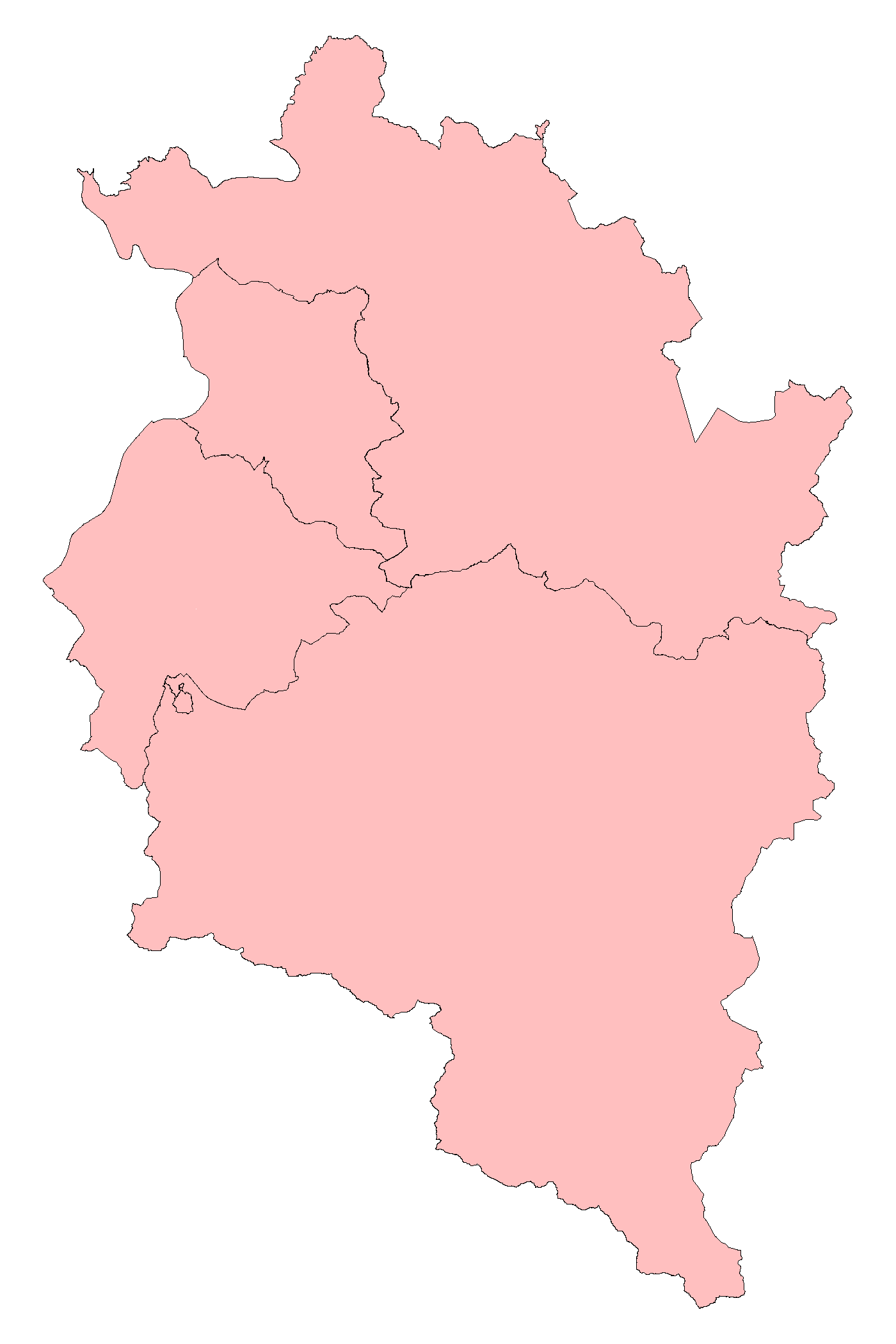
Districts of Vorarlberg. Clockwise from north: Bregenz, Bludenz, Feldkirch, and Dornbirn

The main rivers in Vorarlberg are the Ill (running through the Montafon and Walgau valleys into the Rhine), the Rhine (forming the border with Switzerland), the Bregenzer Ache and the Dornbirner Ach. One of the shortest rivers is the Galina. Important lakes, apart from Lake Constance are Lüner Lake, Silvretta Reservoir, Vermunt Lake, Spuller Lake, the Kops Basin and Formarin Lake; the first four were created for the production of hydroelectric energy. However, even before the dam for the power plant was built, Lüner Lake was the largest mountain lake in the Alps. Most of this hydroelectric energy is exported to Germany at peak times. At night, energy from power plants in Germany is used to pump water back into some of the lakes.

There are several notable mountain ranges in Vorarlberg, such as the Silvretta, the Rätikon, the Verwall and the Arlberg with many well-known skiing regions and ski resorts.

The tallest mountain is Piz Buin, whose rocky peak of 3,312 m (10,866 ft) is surrounded by glaciers. The distance from Lake Constance and the plains of the Alpine Rhine valley across the medium altitude and high Alpine zones to the glaciers of the Silvretta range is a mere 90 km (56 mi).

Lake Constance is bordered by Germany, Switzerland and Austria and is Austria's and Germany's largest lake. It is also the venue for the annual Bregenzer Festspiele.

=== Administrative divisions ===
Vorarlberg is divided into four large districts, from north to south: Bregenz, Dornbirn, Feldkirch and Bludenz. These districts appear on the automobile license plates in form of abbreviations: B, DO, FK and BZ.

=== Biosphere reserve Großes Walsertal ===
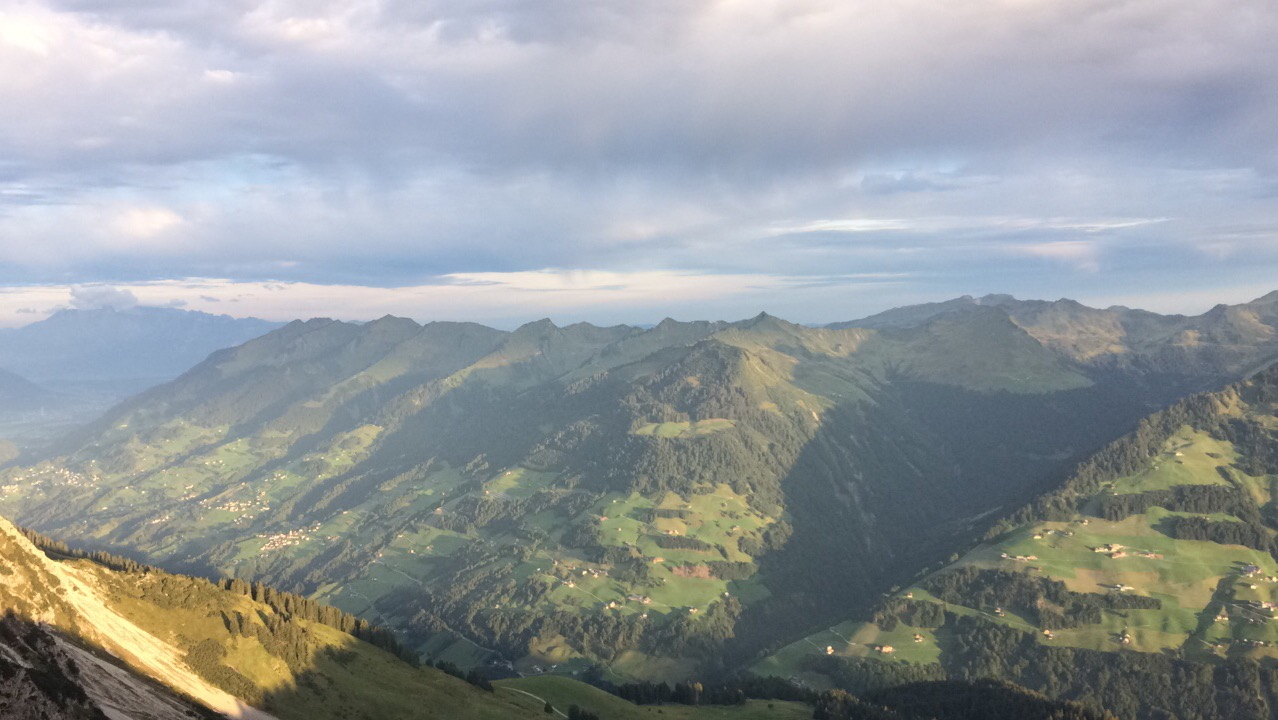
View upon the Biosphere Park Großes Walsertal from the Alpe Steris

The Biosphere Reserve Großes Walsertal covers about 19,200 ha and hosts 3,420 inhabitants and around 180 farms (42% of which are organic ^{as of 2022}). The reserve strives for a sustainable economy and tourism in the region and provides a platform for discussion about society, politics and science. The Biosphere Reserve Großes Walsertal has been a UNESCO biosphere reserve since 2000. Biosphere reserves are the ecological counterpart of the cultural world heritage sites. The biosphere reserve's aim is sustainable development, education and research as well as the protection of natural diversity.

The Nagelfluhkette Nature Park is a cross-border nature park between the German Allgäu and the Austrian Bregenzerwald. The nature park is 24,700 hectares in size. It comprises a high level of biodiversity which is the result of Alpine transhumance (the cultivation of the land by humans) and the geological diversity. The Nagelfluhkette Nature Park offers guided hiking tours.

== History ==
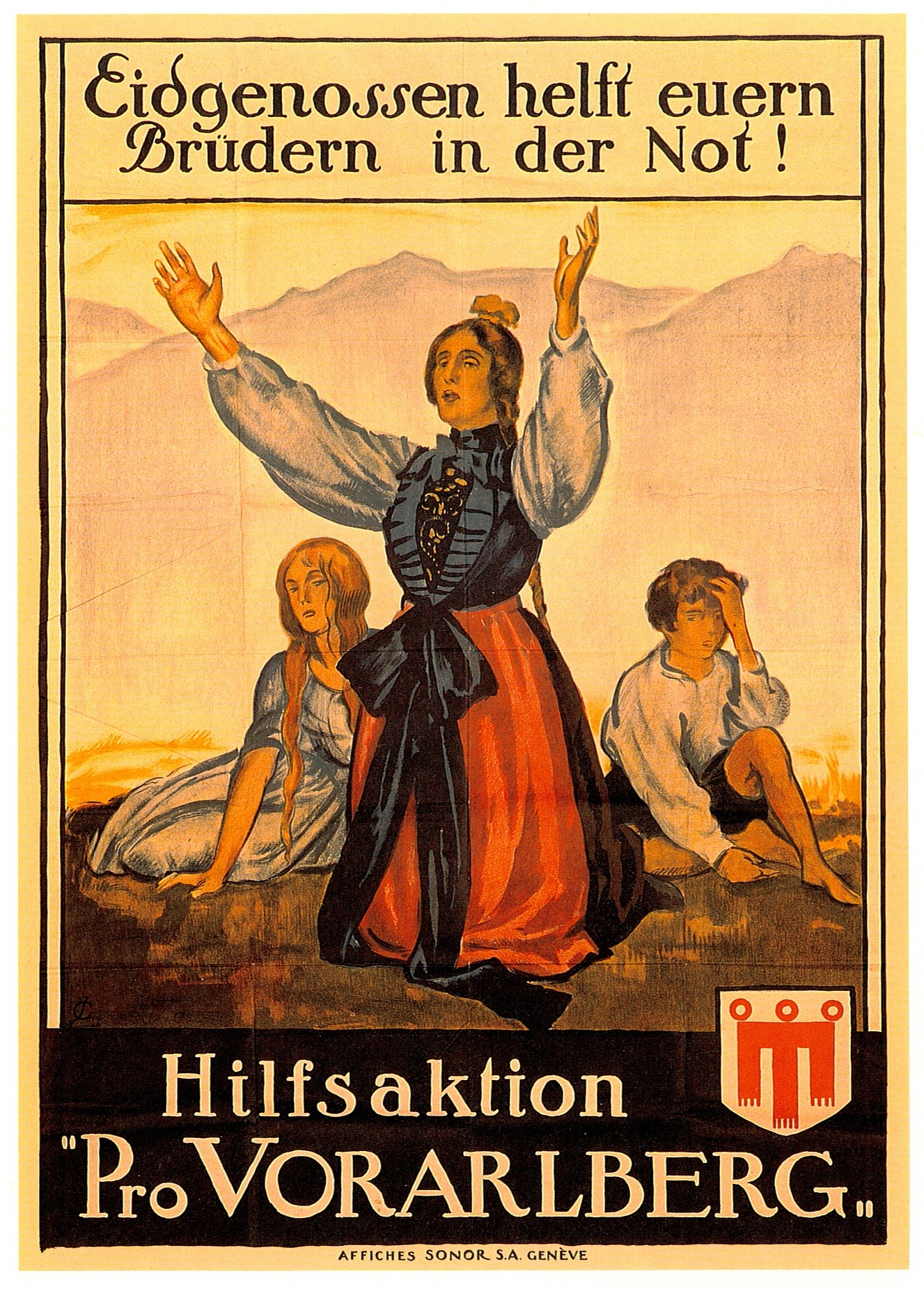
"Confederates, help your brothers in peril!" Swiss poster of the Pro Vorarlberg (de) movement advocating for an accession of Vorarlberg, 1919

Before the Romans conquered Vorarlberg, there were two Celtic tribes settled in this area: the Raeti in the highlands, and the Vindelici in the lowlands, i.e. the Lake Constance region and the Rhine Valley. One of the important settlements of the Vindelici was Brigantion (modern Bregenz), founded around 500 BC. The first settlements in and around Bregenz date from 1500 BC. A Celtic tribe named "Brigantii" is mentioned by Strabo as a sub-tribe in these region of the Alps. The area of Vorarlberg was conquered by the Romans in 15 BC and it became part of the Roman province of Raetia. It included the cities of Brigantium and Clunia (modern Feldkirch). The region was later conquered by Allemanic tribes in c. 450 AD.

It then fell under the rule of the Bavarians and was subsequently settled by the Bavarians and the Lombards. It later fell under the rule of the Counts of Bregenz until 1160 and then to the Counts of Montfort until 1525, when the Habsburgs took control.

The historically-Germanic province, which was a gathering-together of former bishoprics, was still ruled in part by a few semi-autonomous counts and surviving prince-bishops until 1806. Vorarlberg was a part of Further Austria, and parts of the area were ruled by the Counts Montfort of Vorarlberg.

Following World War I, there was a desire by many in Vorarlberg to join Switzerland. In the Vorarlberg annexation referendum held on 11 May 1919, 80.75% of those voting supported a proposal for the state to join the Swiss Confederation. However, the proposed union never took place. Within Switzerland, the Swiss French and Swiss Italians were reluctant to take in another German-speaking area, and Swiss Protestants were somewhat accepting to incorporating such a heavily Catholic area. Opposition came from outside Switzerland as well; for example, Italy wanted Switzerland to give up Ticino if there were any changes on Switzerland's eastern frontier. Vienna and the Allies also objected, out of concern for the balance of power in central Europe. The government of Vorarlberg opposed union with Switzerland, but began half-hearted negotiations with Bern after the overwhelming result of the referendum. When it became apparent that the Swiss were lukewarm at best to absorbing Vorarlberg as well, Vorarlberg remained with Austria.

Following the Second World War Vorarlberg found itself occupied by French troops from 1945 to 1955, along with most of the state of Tyrol.

== Demographics ==
Historical population
Year	Pop.	±%
1869	102,702	—
1880	107,373	+4.5%
1890	116,073	+8.1%
1900	129,237	+11.3%
1910	145,408	+12.5%
1923	139,979	−3.7%
1934	155,402	+11.0%
1939	158,300	+1.9%
1951	193,657	+22.3%
1961	226,323	+16.9%
1971	277,154	+22.5%
1981	305,164	+10.1%
1991	331,472	+8.6%
2001	351,095	+5.9%
2011	370,440	+5.5%
2021	401,037	+8.3%
Source: Censuses

The population of Vorarlberg is 397,094 (as of 1 January 2020). The majority (86%) of residents are of Austrian-Germanic stock with a cultural connection with Switzerland and Liechtenstein to the west and Germany to the north. A sizable proportion of the population's ancestors came from the Swiss canton of Valais in migrations of "Walsers", including the Swiss French in the 19th century by invitation during the days of the Austro-Hungarian Empire. There has been a sizable minority of Turkish descent since the 1960s.

With around 150 inhabitants per square kilometer, Vorarlberg is the second most densely populated province in Austria after Vienna. With the conurbation between Feldkirch and Hörbranz, it has one of the most densely populated areas in Europe. Due to the early industrialization in comparison to other Austrian states, Vorarlberg developed into a classic immigration state as early as the 19th century. The state, which is small in terms of area, has the highest proportion of immigrants next to Vienna. In 2015, this was around 16% of the total population. Residents of German origin make up the largest migrant group, closely followed by immigrants from Turkey. People from countries of the former Yugoslavia are by far the third-largest immigrant group in Vorarlberg.

According to 2021 figures of Statistics Austria, 60.7% of the population are Catholic, and 7.6% are followers of other Christian denominations (3.8% Orthodox Christians, 2.5% Protestants, 1.3% other Christians). The second-largest religion, with a share of 13% is Islam. 0.6% of Vorarlberg's inhabitants profess another religion, while 18.9% profess no affiliation with any religion or denomination.

=== Population development ===
The historical population is given in the following chart:

== Economy and infrastructure ==
=== Location ===
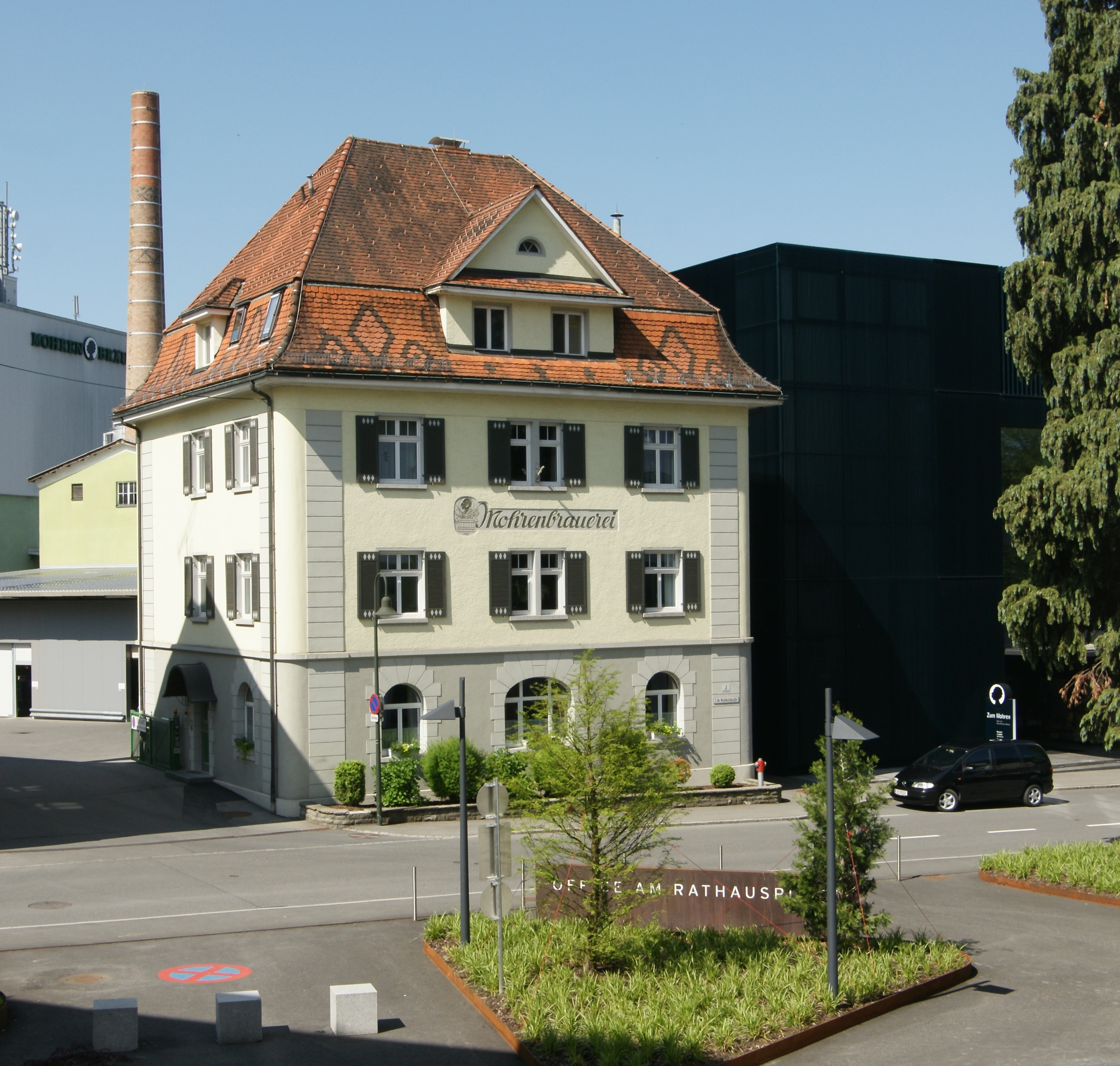
Mohren brewery in Dornbirn

For several years, the Vorarlberg economy has been performing well above the Austrian average. At roughly 66%, its export ratio is the highest among all of Austria's states. While the overall Austrian GDP in 2004 rose by 2.0% in real terms, Vorarlberg recorded an increase of 2.9%. This came as a surprise, particularly as the major trading partners in Germany and Italy did not fare well. Owing to this robust economic performance, Vorarlberg was able to boost its gross regional product in 2014 to 15.2 billion euros according to the Economic Policy Department of the Vorarlberg Chamber of Trade. This translates into a nominal increase of 3.4% (cf Austria as a whole +5.2%). The Gross domestic product (GDP) of the state was 19.1 billion € in 2018, accounting for 4.9% of the Austria's economic output. GDP per capita adjusted for purchasing power was €43,000 or 143% of the EU27 average in the same year. Vorarlberg is the state with the third highest GDP per capita in Austria. Vorarlberg and especially the Rhine Valley is one of the wealthiest areas in the world, with a very high standard of living. By far the biggest company in Vorarlberg is Alpla (plastic packaging), followed by Blum, Grass, Gebrüder Weiss (transport and logistics), Zumtobel Group (lighting systems), Doppelmayr (cablecars), Rauch (beverages) and Wolford (textiles).

Currently, five breweries are located in Vorarlberg: Mohrenbrauerei August Huber (in Dornbirn, since 1834), Brauerei Fohrenburg (in Bludenz, since 1881), Brauerei Egg (in Egg, since 1894), Vorarlberger Brauereigenosschenschaft – Brauerei Frastanz (in Frastanz, since 1902), Grabhers Sudwerk (in Bregenz, since 2016).

Overall, the economic expansion of Vorarlberg is "very positive and for the future rated more dynamic than for the other states". Vorarlberg plans to be self-sufficient in energy by 2050.

=== Agriculture ===
In addition to the flourishing textile, clothing, electronics, machinery and packing materials industries of the Alpine Rhine Valley, there is also a broad agricultural base, especially in the Bregenzerwald (Bregenzerwald), which is known for its dairy products and tourism.

==== Alpine transhumance and cheese production ====
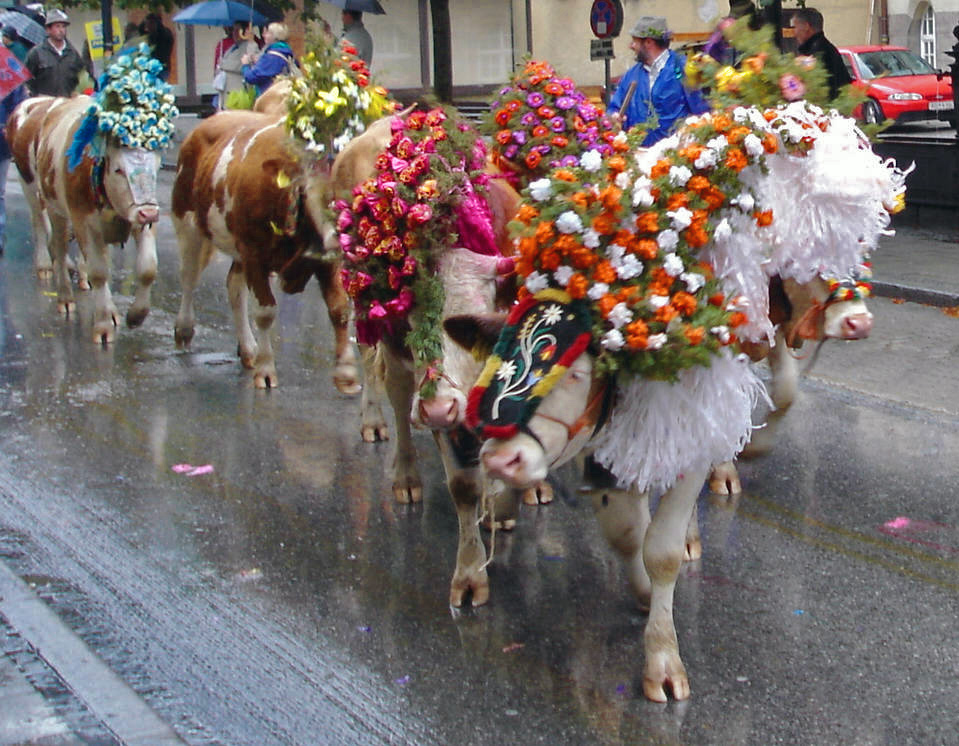
Almabtrieb, the movement of cattle from the high pastures to the villages. This tradition is popular with tourists.

The three-level movement farming ("Dreistufenwirtschaft") is essential to the economy of the mountainous regions in Vorarlberg. It is also known as Alpine transhumance and describes a seasonal droving of grazing livestock between the valleys in winter and the high mountain pastures in summer.

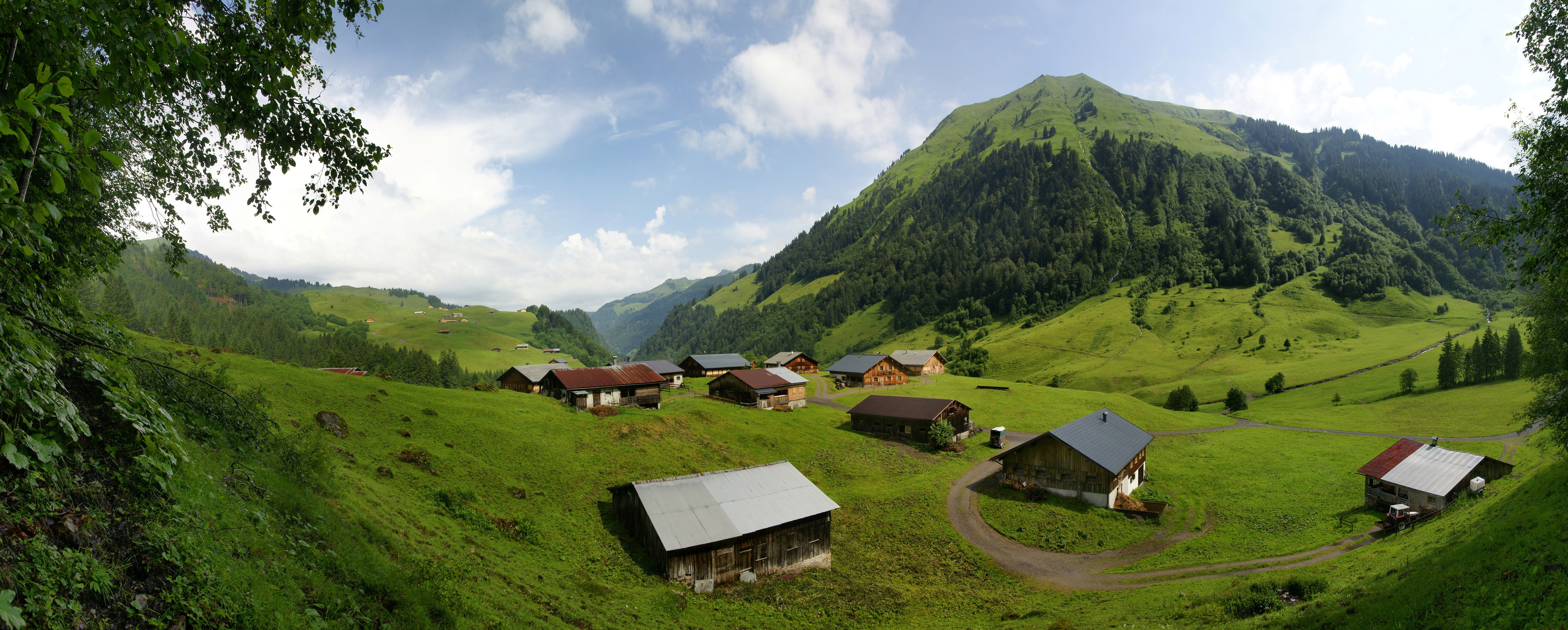
Vorderhopfreben/Üntschenspitze in Au-Schoppernau as an example for the agricultural use of the mountainous region

Alpine transhumance has a strong impact on the production of cheese in the Alps. It ensures that the cattle produces high-quality aromatic milk, the so-called Heumilch ("hay milk"), based on its special diet of natural meadow grass in comparison to silage. The use of hay milk in cheese production contributes to the distinctive flavour that determines more than 30 Alpine cheeses, including Vorarlberger Alpkäse, Vorarlberger Bergkäse, Großwalsertaler Bergkäse, and Sura Kees.

With the aim to support and preserve the local dairy production and the traditional agricultural heritage, the Bregenzerwald Cheese Route was founded in 1998. It is an organisation which connects farmers, traders and craftsmen. Along the cheese route, visitors are invited to watch the cheese production process and participate in culinary tastings.

Many cultural habits like Yodel, Alphorn or Schwingen were developed during this time. This seasonal nomadism led to the rich culture, architecture and love for nature found in Vorarlberg. A significant cultural icon unique to this area is the festive movement of cattle from the pastures to the villages in autumn. This tradition is especially popular with tourists.

=== Energy sector ===
The energy sector is one of the founders of Vorarlberg's economy, in which hydropower is the most important source of energy. This is mainly used for the production of peak current. Vorarlberg was the first region in Europe where more sustainable energy was produced than consumed. Green electricity from Vorarlberg is therefore also sold to the German Westallgäu, to Switzerland and to other Austrian provinces. The largest electricity producer in Vorarlberg is illwerke VKW. They produce 75% of the electricity in Vorarlberg, mainly by hydropower.

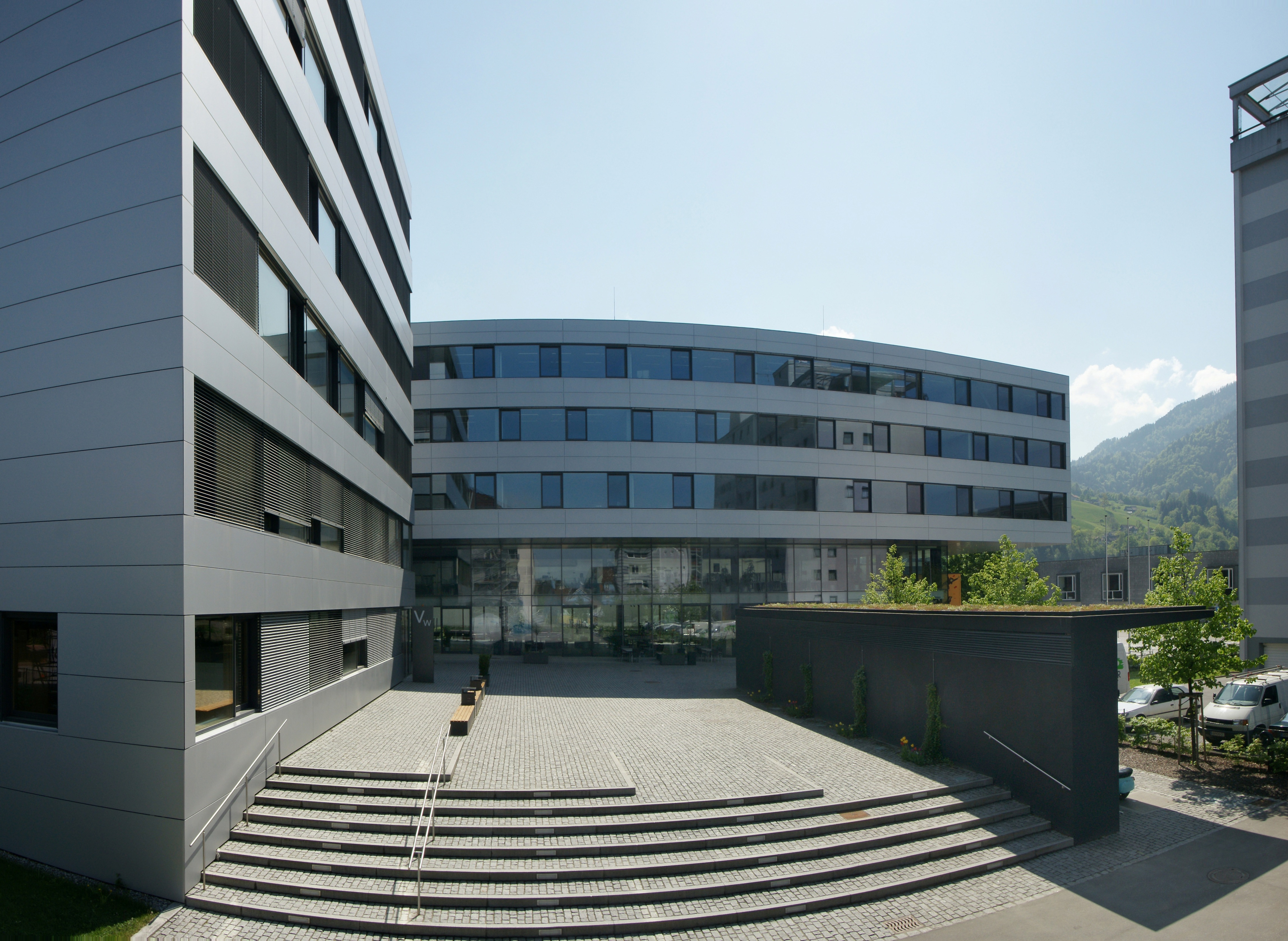
University of Applied Sciences in Dornbirn

=== Education ===
Two higher education institutions in Vorarlberg are the Vorarlberg University of Applied Sciences (German: Fachhochschule Vorarlberg) in Dornbirn and the University College of Teacher Education Vorarlberg (German: Pädagogische Hochschule Vorarlberg) in Feldkirch.

Originally founded as a technical school in 1989, the Vorarlberg University of Applied Sciences achieved the status of an officially recognized university in 1999. It offers bachelor's and master's degrees in business, engineering and technology, design and social work. About 1350 students have enrolled for the term 2018/19. The Fachhochschule Vorarlberg is considered one of Austria's best applied universities in the field of technology.

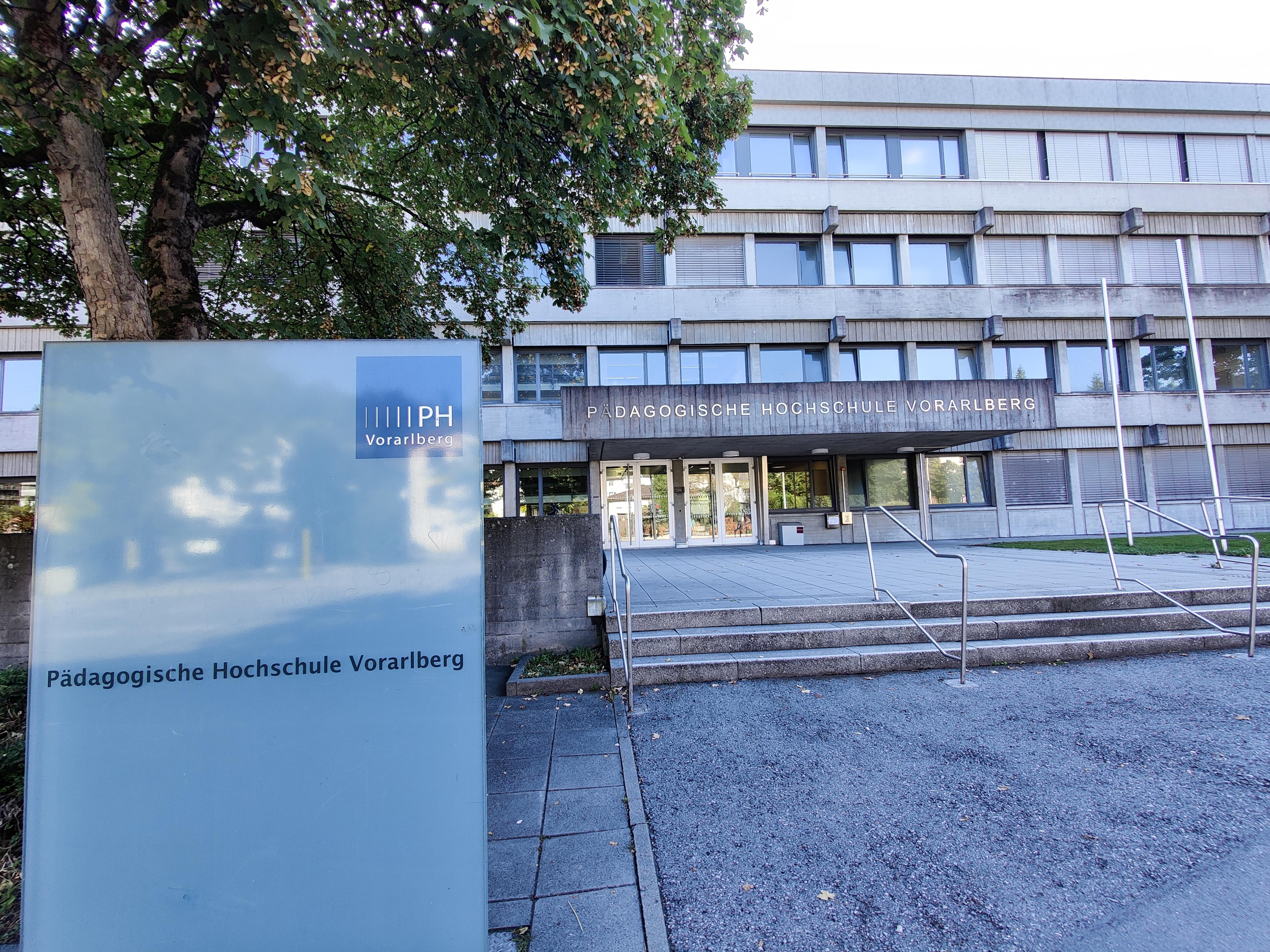
The University College of Teacher Education Vorarlberg in Feldkirch

The University College of Teacher Education Vorarlberg was founded in 2007 and offers bachelor's and master's degrees in primary and secondary education. It administers its own elementary and middle school, in which students from the university can complete their student teaching.

The vai Vorarlberger Architektur Institut is an interface in the field of Baukultur and serves as a networking platform.

=== Transportation ===
==== Road ====
Vorarlberg is crossed in a north–south direction by a motorway, the Rheintal/Walgau Autobahn (A14). It connects with the Bundesautobahn 96 at the Austria–Germany border near Hörbranz and follows the Alpine Rhine Valley southwards to Feldkirch. It then continues south-eastwards along the river Ill to Bludenz, where it connects with the Arlberg Schnellstraße (S16) to Tyrol over the Arlberg. The A14 is linked with the A13 motorway in Switzerland via a road that crosses the Austria-Switzerland border at Lustenau/Au.

==== Rail ====
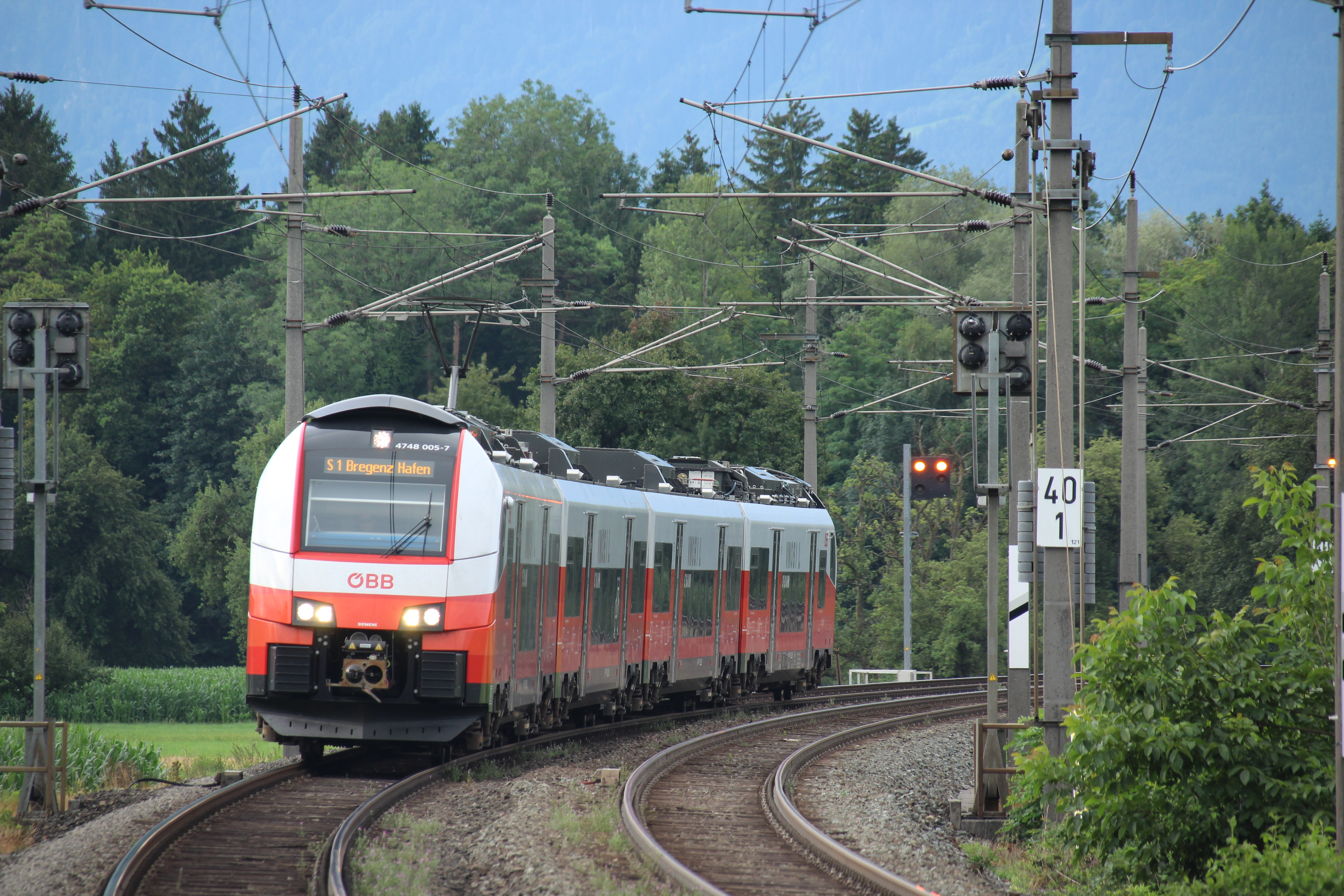
S1 regional train of Vorarlberg S-Bahn

The main line is the Vorarlberg railway line, which traverses the state in north–south direction and which extends northwards into Germany. South of Bregenz, it connects with the St. Margrethen–Lauterach line, which leads towards Switzerland. In Feldkirch, the main line meets the Feldkirch–Buchs railway line to Liechtenstein and Switzerland. The Vorarlberg railway line's southern terminus is Bludenz, where it meets the Arlberg Railway to Tyrol and the Bludenz–Schruns railway (Montafonerbahn) line to Schruns in the Montafon Valley. Most of these lines are owned and operated by Austrian Federal Railways (ÖBB). Since December 2023, Westbahn also operates between Wien Westbahnhof and Bregenz. Regional train services are provided by Vorarlberg S-Bahn, with some lines being also part of Bodensee S-Bahn.

There are also two heritage railway lines: Bregenz Forest Railway and International Rhine Regulation Railway.

The following is an alphabetical list of Vorarlberg's active railway stations:

- Altach
- Altenstadt
- Bludenz
- Bludenz-Moos
- Bregenz
- Bregenz Hafen
- Bregenz Riedenburg
- Brunnenfeld-Stallehr
- Dornbirn
- Dornbirn-Schoren
- Feldkirch
- Feldkirch Amberg
- Frastanz
- Gisingen
- Götzis
- Hard-Fussach
- Haselstauden
- Hatlerdorf
- Hohenems
- Kaltenbrunnen
- Klaus in Vorarlberg
- Langen am Arlberg
- Lauterach
- Lauterach Unterfeld
- Lochau-Hörbranz
- Lorüns
- Ludesch
- Lustenau
- Nenzing
- Nüziders
- Rankweil
- Schlins-Beschling
- Schruns
- Schwarzach in Vorarlberg
- St. Anton im Montafon
- Sulz-Röthis
- Tisis
- Tschagguns
- Vandans
- Wolfurt

In addition, there are five defunct railway stations on the Arlberg Railway line: Braz, Dalaas, Hintergasse, Klösterle and Wald am Arlberg.

==== Air ====
The state doesn't have its own civil airport. The nearest ones are Zurich Airport, Munich Airport, Innsbruck Airport, Friedrichshafen Airport and St. Gallen–Altenrhein Airport. The Hohenems-Dornbirn Airfield is a public aerodrome near Dornbirn.

== Tourism ==
The tourist industry employs a considerable number of Vorarlbergers. There are around 12,000 employees working in this industry which represent approximately 11% of the total workforce (107,575 in 2015). Arrivals are slightly higher in winter (1.23 million in 2015) than in summer (1.14 million in 2015). The real difference lies in overnight-stays indicating that Vorarlberg is a strong winter destination. Overnight-stays in winter reach as high as 5.11 million which is quite large when compared to the summer season with 3.7 million overnight stays.

The largest (and best-known) touristic regions are:

- the Bregenzerwald
- the Bludenz-District
- the Arlberg region (including the high-class ski resorts Lech and Zürs)
- the Brandnertal
- the Montafon
- the Kleinwalsertal and
- the Großwalsertal.

=== Architecture hotels ===
This is an incomplete list of hotels with a focus on architecture. For the complete list, go to:

- TINN Naturchalet (Walsertal)
- Hotel Gasthof Adler (Schoppernau)
- Hotel Flint (Dornbirn)
- Peterhof Furx (Furx)
- Erlebnisbaumhaus Sulzberg (Adventure Tree House) (Sulzberg)
- Fuchsegg Eco Lodge (Bregenzerwald)
- Hotel Bären (Mellau)
- Hotel Am Holand (Au im Bregenzerwald)
- Haus Benedikta (Rheintal)
- Hotel Schwärzler (Bregenz)
- Tempel 74 (Mellau)
- Alpencamping Nenzing (Nenzing)
- Gasthof Rössle (Braz)
- Naturhotel Chesa Valisa (Kleinwalsertal)
- Das Tschofen (Bludenz)

=== Architectural highlights ===
In Vorarlberg, several public buildings for culture, tourism and leisure have been awarded with national and international prizes for architecture.

Some of them are:

- Angelika Kaufmann Museum (Schwarzenberg)
- Bus:Stop Krumbach
- Festspiel - und Kongresshaus am See (Bregenz)
- Frauenmuseum, Feuerwehr - und Kulturhaus (Hittisau)
- Georunde Rindberg (Sibratsgfäll)
- inatura Erlebnis (Dornbirn)
- Islamic graveyard (Altach)
- Kapelle Salgenreute (Krumbach)
- Kulturpavillon (Blumenegg)
- Kunsthaus (Bregenz)
- Messehallen 9-12 (Dornbirn)
- Montforthaus (Feldkirch)
- Propstei (St. Gerold)
- Public library (Dornbirn)
- Stadtbad - Indoor Swimming Pool (Dornbirn)
- Vorarlberg museum (Bregenz)
- Werkraumhaus (Andelsbuch)

=== Winter ===
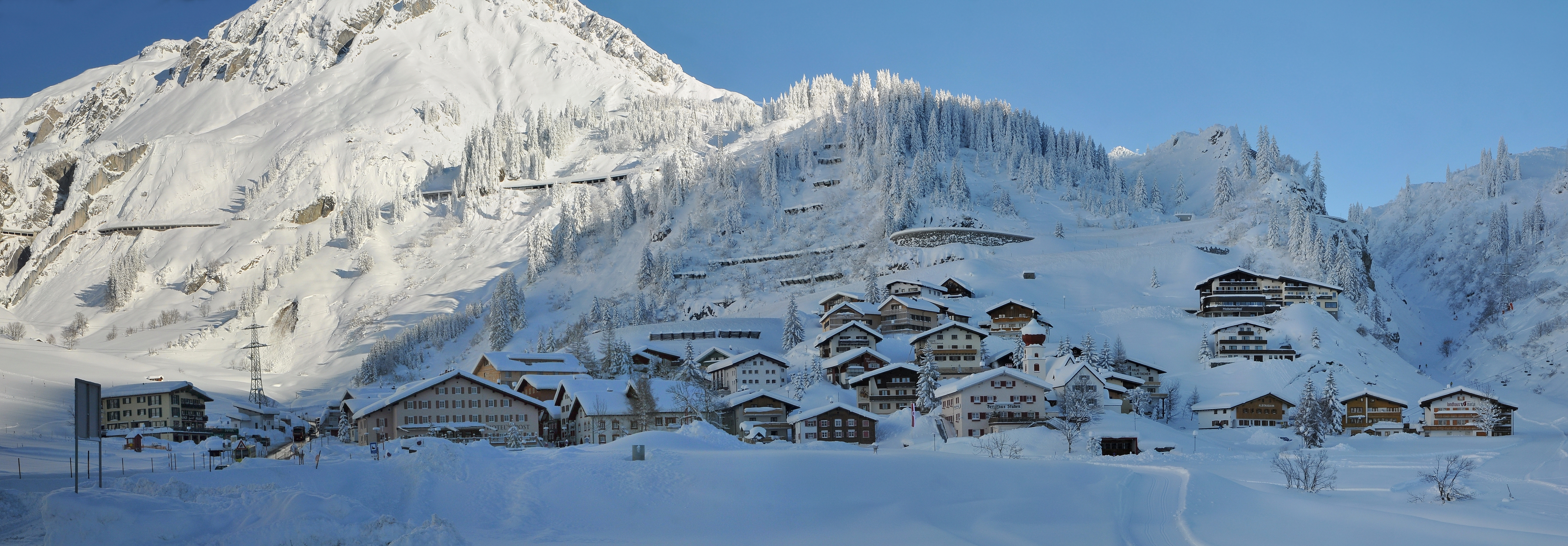
Panorama view of Stuben am Arlberg

The largest tourist attractions are the mountains and the numerous ski resorts. In the cold season, winter sports enthusiasts will find the correct conditions for their favored sports, some being skiing, cross country skiing, freeriding, snowboarding, ice skating, sled dog rides, carriage rides, tobogganing, snow and fun parks.

Vorarlberg's largest ski resorts include:

- Ski Arlberg
  - Stuben am Arlberg
  - Lech-Zürs and Oberlech
  - Warth and Schröcken
- Silvretta Montafon (Ski area)
- Kleinwalsertal
- Brandnertal
- Damüls-Mellau (Ski area)
- Diedamskopf
- Großes Walsertal/Fontanella-Faschina
- Klostertal

The ski resorts Silvretta Montafon and Ski Arlberg (which is partly located in Tyrol) are the two largest ski areas in Vorarlberg. Ski Arlberg is the largest connected ski area in Austria since the season of 2016/17. It has 305 km of slopes and 111 lifts. It includes Lech, Zürs, Oberlech, Warth, Schröcken, Stuben and the Tyrolean municipalities of St. Anton and St. Christoph.

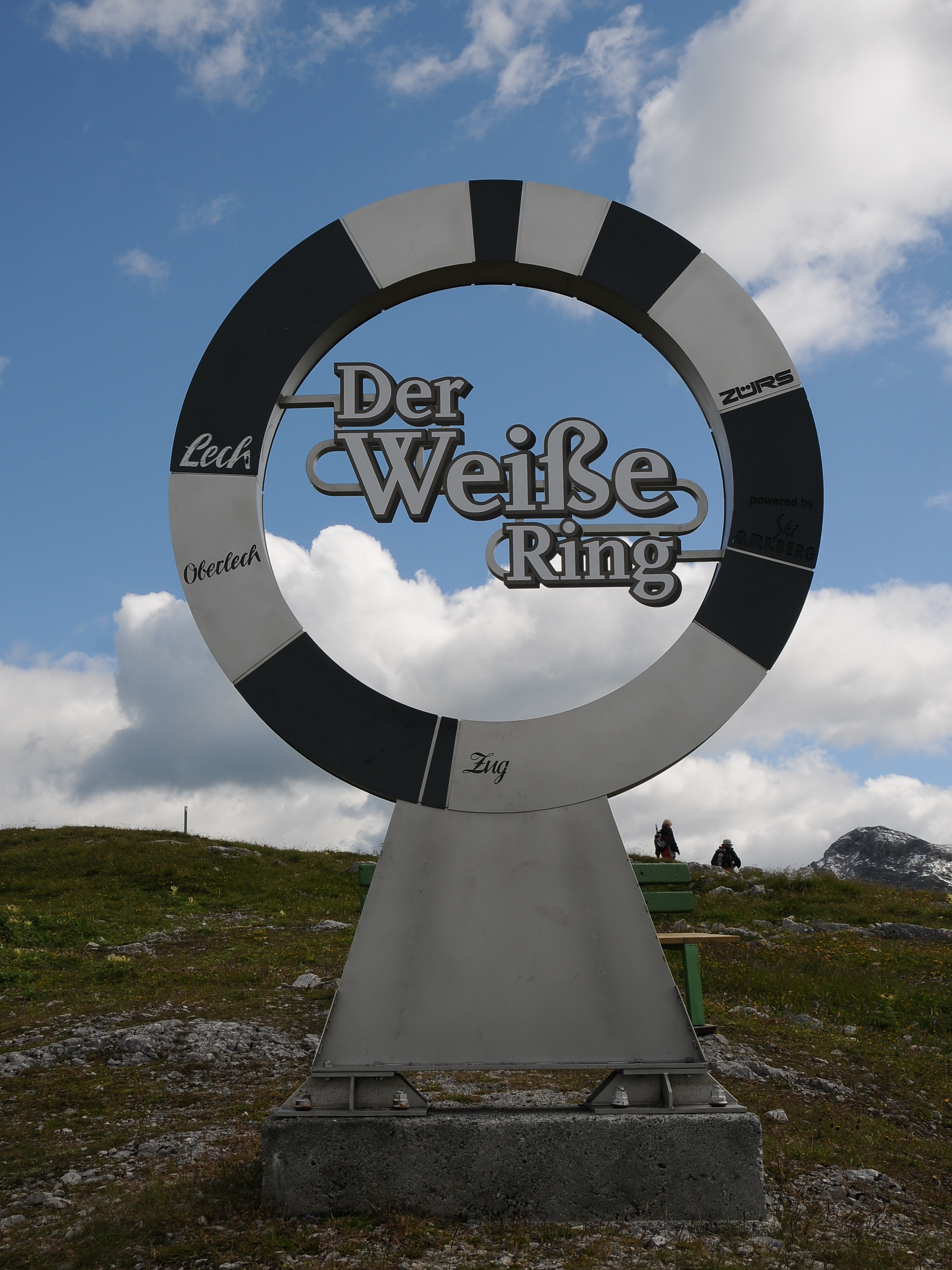
The ski circuit Der Weiße Ring in Lech am Arlberg

The places Lech and Zürs are known for their exclusivity and luxury, for which reason many prominent people go to these ski resorts. An example of this is the Dutch royal family which goes there on skiing holidays every year and has been staying in the prestigious Gasthof Post for four generations. A famous ski race is Der Weiße Ring ('The White Ring') where skiers race from Lech to Zürs. The 22 km long route is named after its ring-shaped track and the snowy conditions in this region. It is considered to be particularly difficult.

The Ski Ride Vorarlberg is a combination of skiing, touring and freeriding while crossing Vorarlberg. The route starts in the Kleinwalsertal in the north, continues through the Bregenz Forest, over the Arlberg and the Klostertal to the Montafon valley in the south. The guided tour usually takes up to 7 days and is intended for experienced skiers.

Damüls-Mellau is a notable ski area in terms of reliable snow conditions. In 2007, Damüls was named 'snowiest village in the world'. During the measuring period, the average snow height per winter season was approximately 9.30 m.

Skiers from these regions include Anita Wachter, Egon Zimmermann, Gerhard Nenning, Mario Reiter, Hubert Strolz, and Hannes Schneider, as well as the ski-jumper Toni Innauer.

=== Summer ===
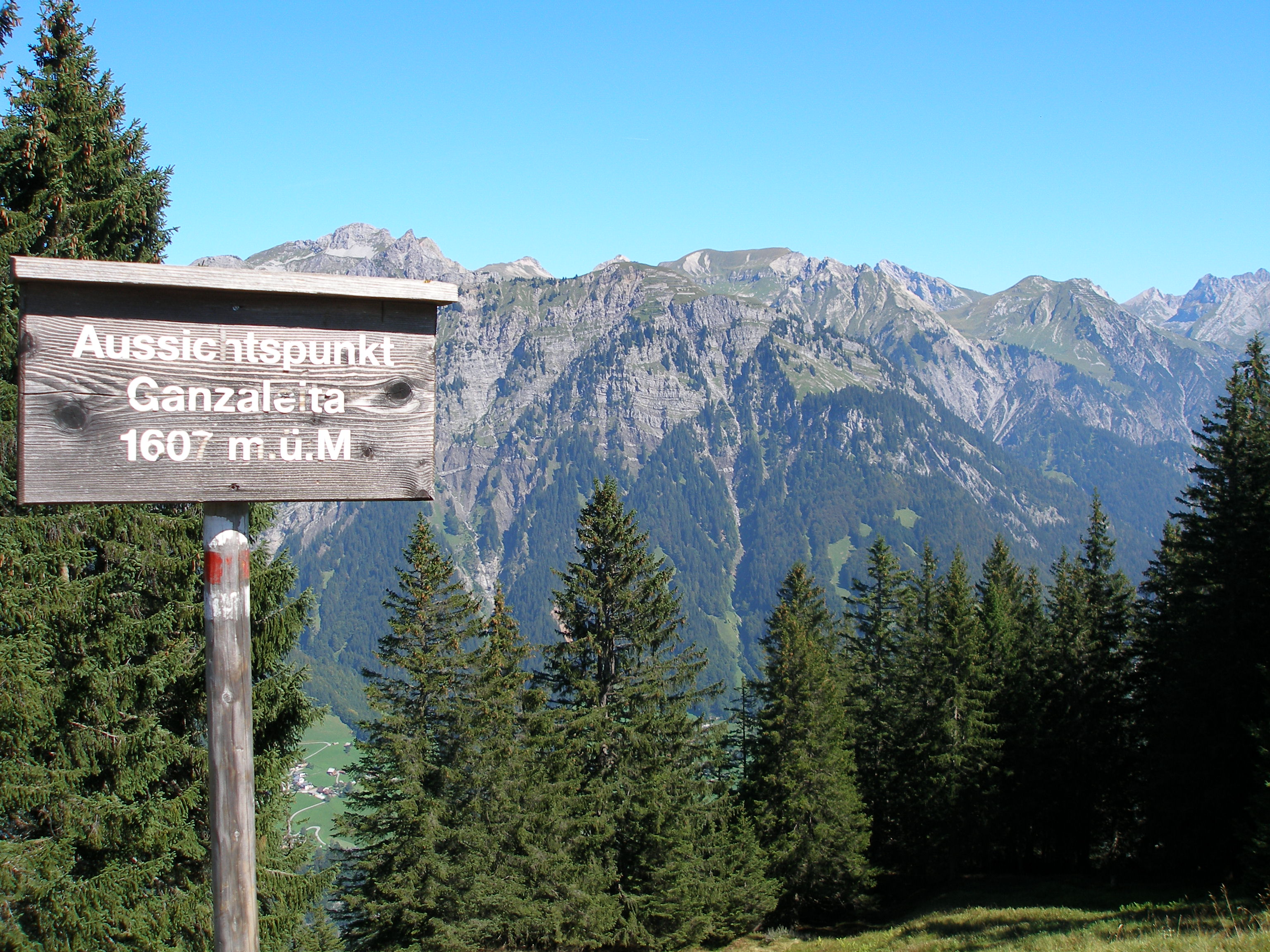
Hiking in the Montafon valley

In the summer, mountain sports like hiking, mountain biking, climbing and trail-running play a big role in Vorarlberg's tourism. In total, Vorarlberg has more than 5,500 kilometers of hiking trails in different heights for both experienced and inexperienced walkers. Many ski areas operate cable cars throughout summer which makes them ideal for mountaineers.

All over Vorarlberg, themed hikes are being offered, e.g., culinary hikes, herbal walks, educational hikes for children, and night walks. The theme route "Gauertaler AlpkulTour", which extends through the cultural landscape of the Montafon in the Rätikon mountains, is a popular walking route among tourists. Lake Constance is a pivot for hikers, pilgrims, fishers and bird watchers. For a long time, it has served as a reference point for important pilgrims' paths, including the Lake Constance walking path, parts of the pilgrimage route to Santiago de Compostela and the European hiking routes E1, E4 and E5.

Offering some 1,500 kilometers of marked mountain bike trails, Vorarlberg attracts cyclists of all skill levels. Guided mountain bike tours are held in the Brandnertal and Klostertal. The Bregenzerwald bike school offers various bike-related activities including bike camps, technique courses and racing bike tours.

The Vorarlberg Circular Hiking Trail ("Min Weag" - My trail/path) offers a variety of cultural and natural spaces in six regions. The elevation profiles range from the rolling hills of the Bregenzerwald to above the tree line in the Silvretta and Rätikon. The trail was developed by Vorarlberg Tourism in collaboration with local mountain guides.

== Culture ==
Alemannic German language map

=== Language ===
Owing to their location isolated from the rest of Austria, most Vorarlbergers speak a very distinct German dialect, the High Alemannic German, that other Austrians might have difficulty understanding, since the dialects in the rest of Austria form part of the Bavarian-Austrian language group, whereas the Vorarlberg dialect is part of the Alemannic dialect continuum. Alemannic dialects are also spoken in Liechtenstein, Switzerland (as Swiss German), Baden-Württemberg, the south west of Bavaria and the Alsace region of France. The Vorarlberg dialect is further divided into a number of regional sub-dialects (e.g. that of the Montafon, the Bregenzerwald and Lustenau are some of the most distinct) which tend to differ considerably from each other. In fact even within these regions the dialects may vary from one town or village to the next.

=== Traditional clothing ===
Traditional costumes ("tracht") have a long history in Vorarlberg. Many valleys and villages have their own kind of garb, each with special characteristics from certain style periods. The Bregenzerwälder garb is the oldest, it originated in the 15/16th century and is also called "d'Juppô" (Bavarian: "Juppe"). The Montafon garb is inspired by the baroque era. A whole set of Tracht consists of several elements: the "Juppe" (the apron), a headgear (caps, hats), a blouse, a "Tschopa" (jacket), and stockings. The hairstyle (for example braided hair) can also be part of the Tracht.

In the 1970s, very few Vorarlbergers wore tracht. The reason for this was strict regulations with regard to the people wearing Tracht. For example, Bregenzerwälder ladies with short hair ought not to wear tracht, because their hair was too short for the suitable hair style ("Wälderzöpfe"). It was only when the regulations were loosened and the clothes were individualised in the 1990s that wearing tracht became more popular. Today, traditional garb is mainly worn on festive occasions. In the Juppenwerkstatt Riefensberg, tracht is still traditionally manufactured. There is a "national association for people wearing traditional costume" (Landestrachtenverband) that supports Vorarlberg's Tracht wearing inhabitants and music chapels.

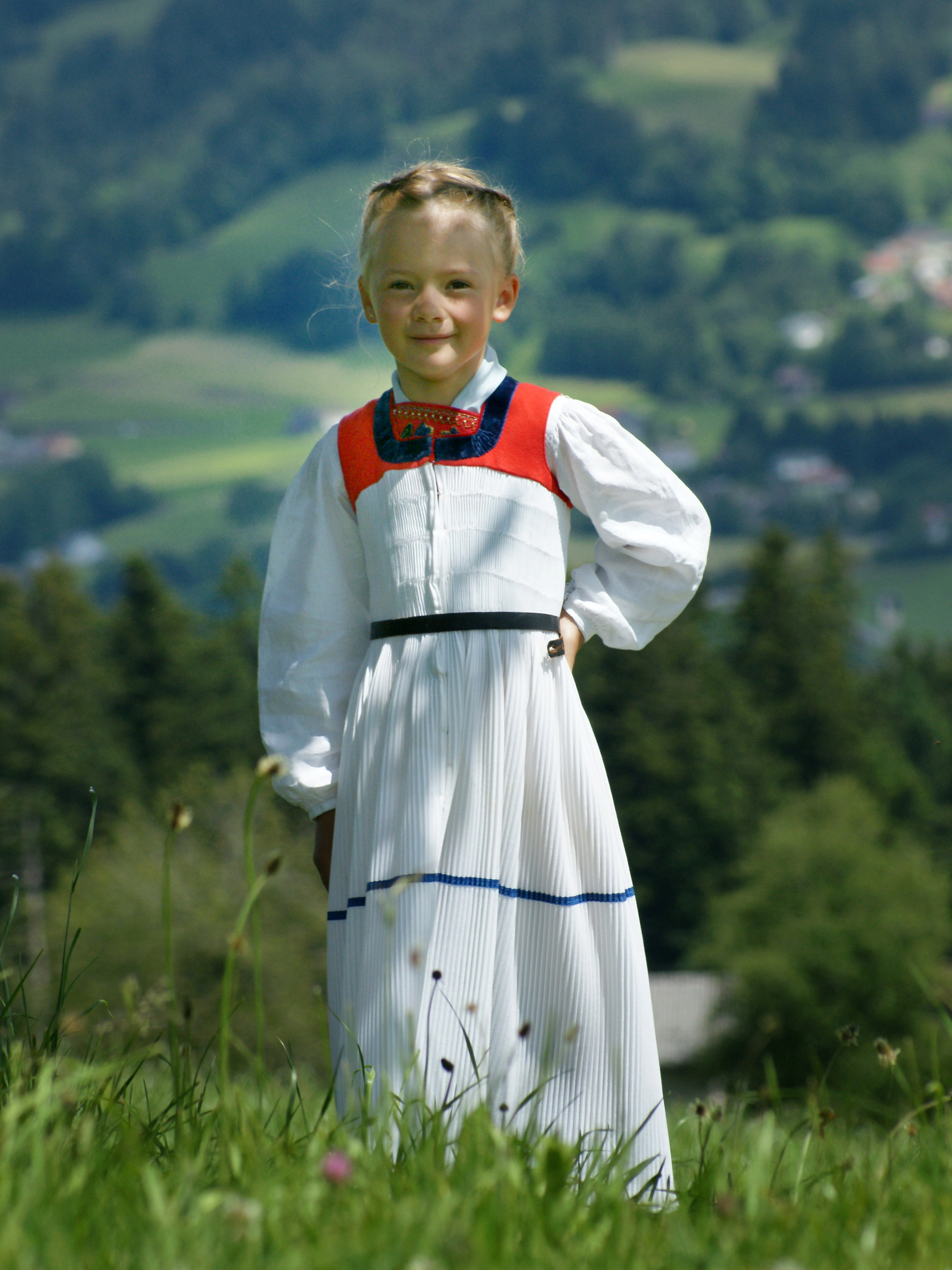
Bregenz Forest tracht: girl in a white "juppe"

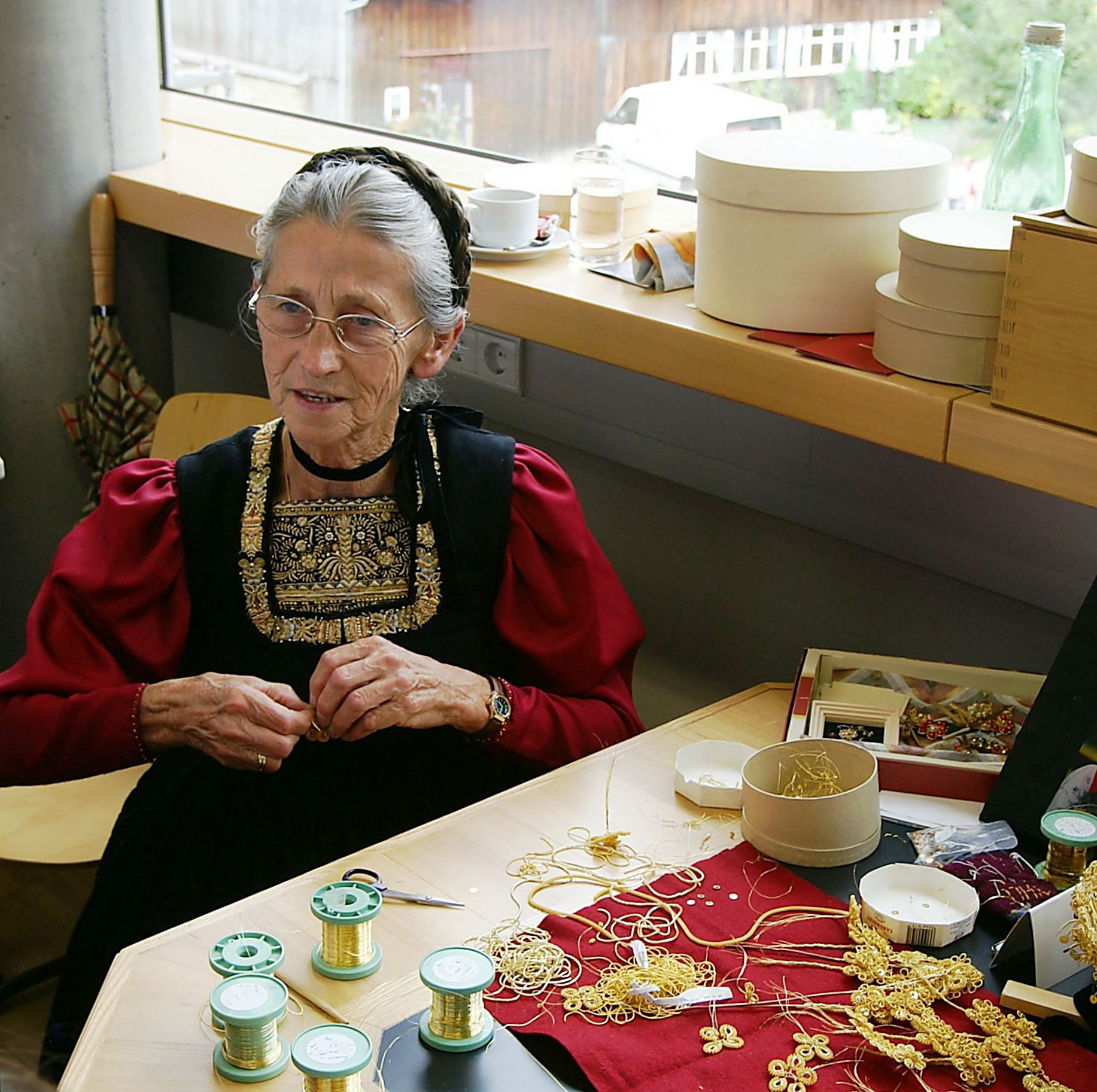
Woman fabricating a traditional juppe costume in Bezau (2007)

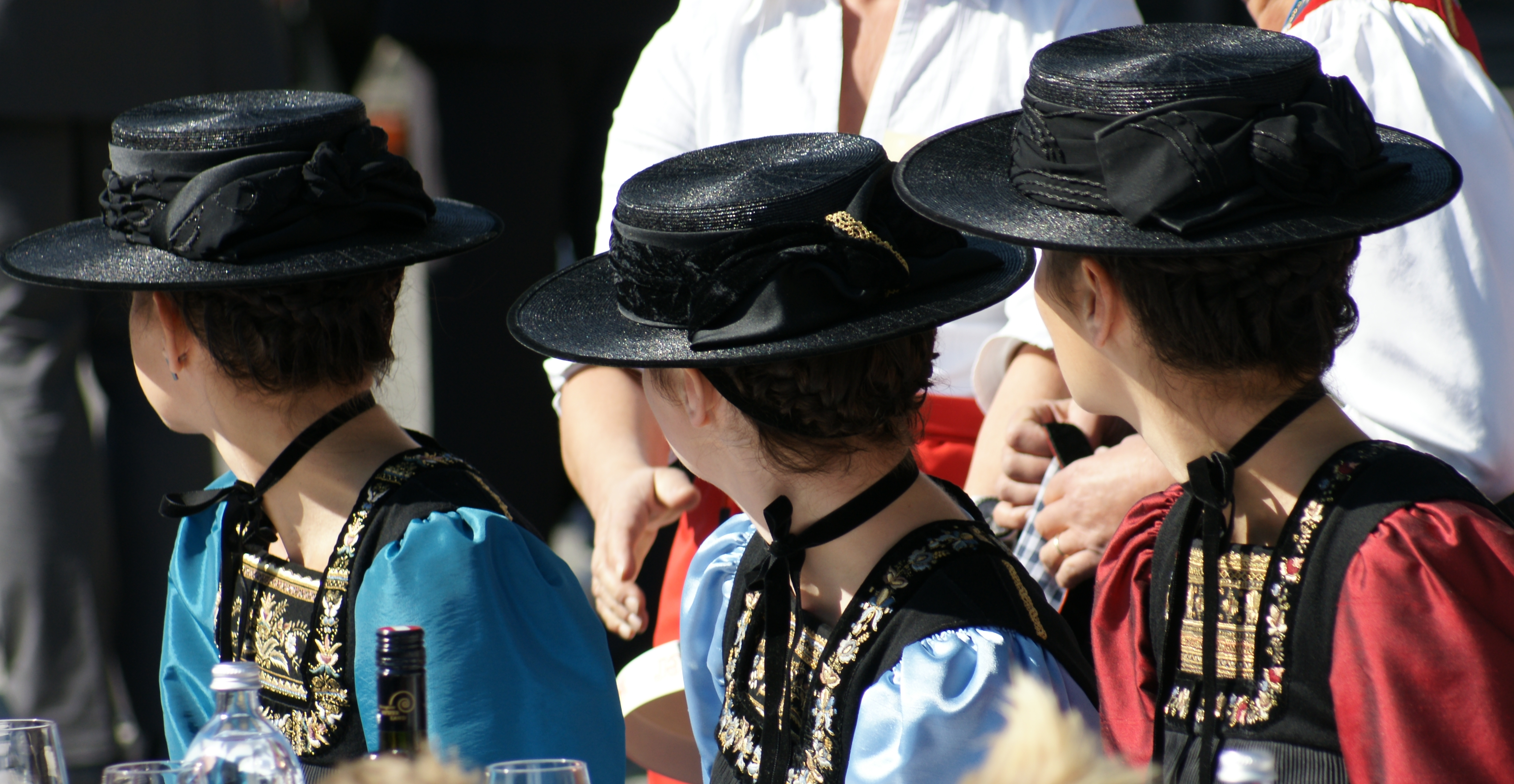
Women wearing Bregenz Forest costumes and "Schäohüte" (summer straw hats)

=== Cuisine ===
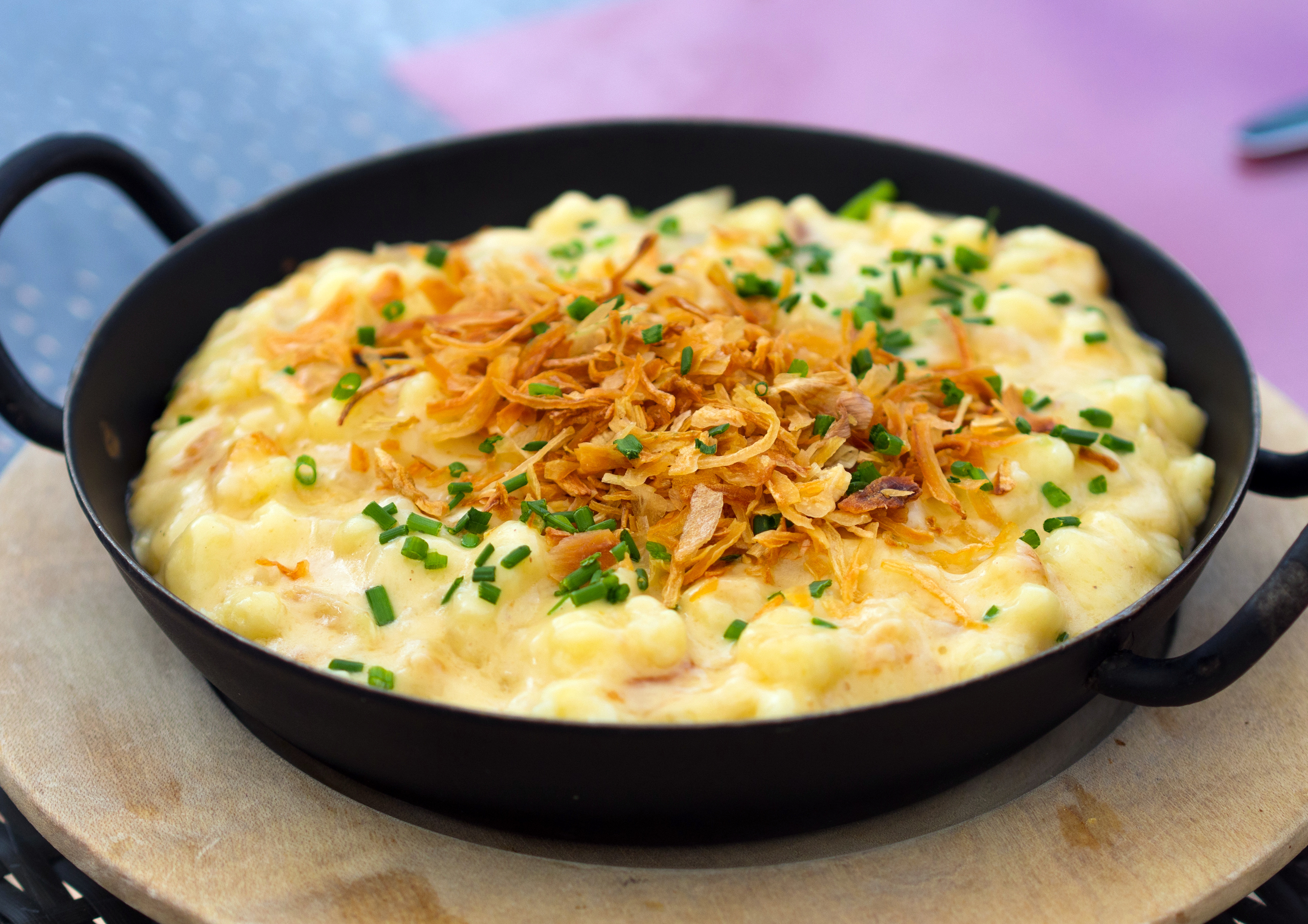
Traditional Käsespätzle served in a pan

The influence of the Alemannic cuisine of neighbouring countries works more on Vorarlberg cuisine than Austrian cuisine. Cheese and other dairy products play a major role in traditional Vorarlberg meals. Typical dishes from the Vorarlberg region are: Käsespätzle or Käsknöpfle (noodles of flour and eggs with cheese and onion), Riebel (dish of corn and wheat semolina, served spicy or sweet), Flädlesuppe (broth with savoury pancake strips), Grumpara mit Käs (peel pastry with cheese), Öpfelküachle (apples baked in pancake dough, topped with sugar and cinnamon). Mostbröckle (pickled and smoked sausage), originally from Switzerland, is also a very popular product.

==== Regional dairy products ====
- Bergkäse ("mountain cheese"). The texture of the Bergkäse is rather hard, sometimes with small holes or cracks, with a strong taste, which is sometimes nutty. In the strict sense, Bergkäse is a cheese produced in the low mountain range (between 600 and 1500 m). Examples of Vorarlberg's Bergkäse are the Vorarlberger Bergkäse or Großwalsertaler Bergkäse named "Walserstolz".
- Alpkäse ("mountain pasture cheese" or "alp cheese"). Alpkäse is a hard cheese that resembles Bergkäse in taste and texture. The difference between these cheeses lies in the period and place of production. Bergkäse is produced year-round, so even in winter, when the animals are in the stables and fed with hay. Alpkäse is a seasonal product, only produced in the summer between May and September on high mountain meadows above 1500 m (Alpine pastures or alps), where the animals graze Alpine herbs. An example is the Vorarlberger Alpkäse.
- Sura Kees ("sour cheese"). Originally from the Montafon valley, Sura Kees has been known there since the 12th century and resembles the Tyrolean grey cheese. It is a low-fat cheese with a mild aroma reminiscent of cream cheese, its taste varies from mildly spicy to sour, always with a salty undertone. The Sura Kees is usually served with vinegar, oil and onions, or alone on black bread or eaten with potatoes.

=== Festivals and annual events ===
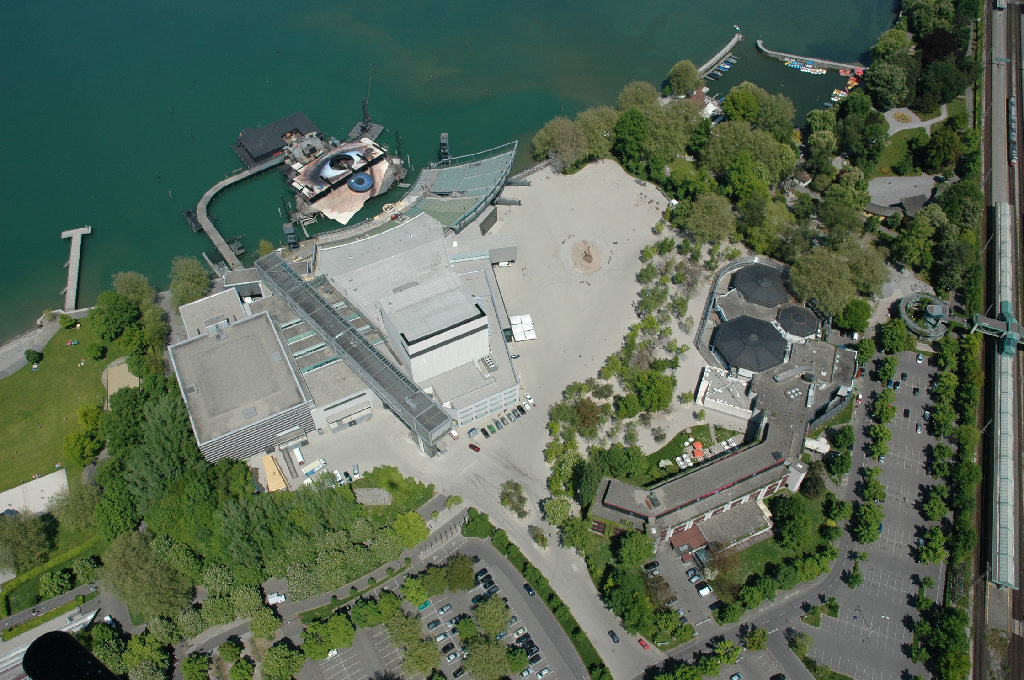
Aerial view of the Lake Stage (Bregenzer Festspiele)

Vorarlberg provides cultural attractions of all kinds. The Bregenzer Festspiele is the best known festival of the region and poses one of Austria's cultural highlights since 1946. It annually takes place in the months of July and August. With operas and musicals such as Die Zauberflöte (The Magic Flute), West Side Story and Carmen, the Bregenzer Festspiele draws hundreds of thousands of spectators every year. Noteworthy is the Seebühne, an impressive stage in Lake Constance where scenes are played.

The Bregenzer Frühling is a dance festival in Bregenz that has been held since 1987 during spring time. Dance ensembles from all over the world perform their new productions, along with Austrian premieres. Each year, five different dance ensembles perform at the Bregenzer Frühling.

Montafoner Resonanzen is a music festival in the Montafon region. It is a series of events held annually on weekends in August and September. Each weekend is dedicated to another genre (classical, jazz, Austrian folk music, organ, cross-over). The locations vary each year. Guests may combine hiking and eating out with the concerts, considering the musical performances are held at extraordinary locations like the Tübinger Hütte at 2,191 m (Gaschurn) or the Panoramagasthof Kristberg.

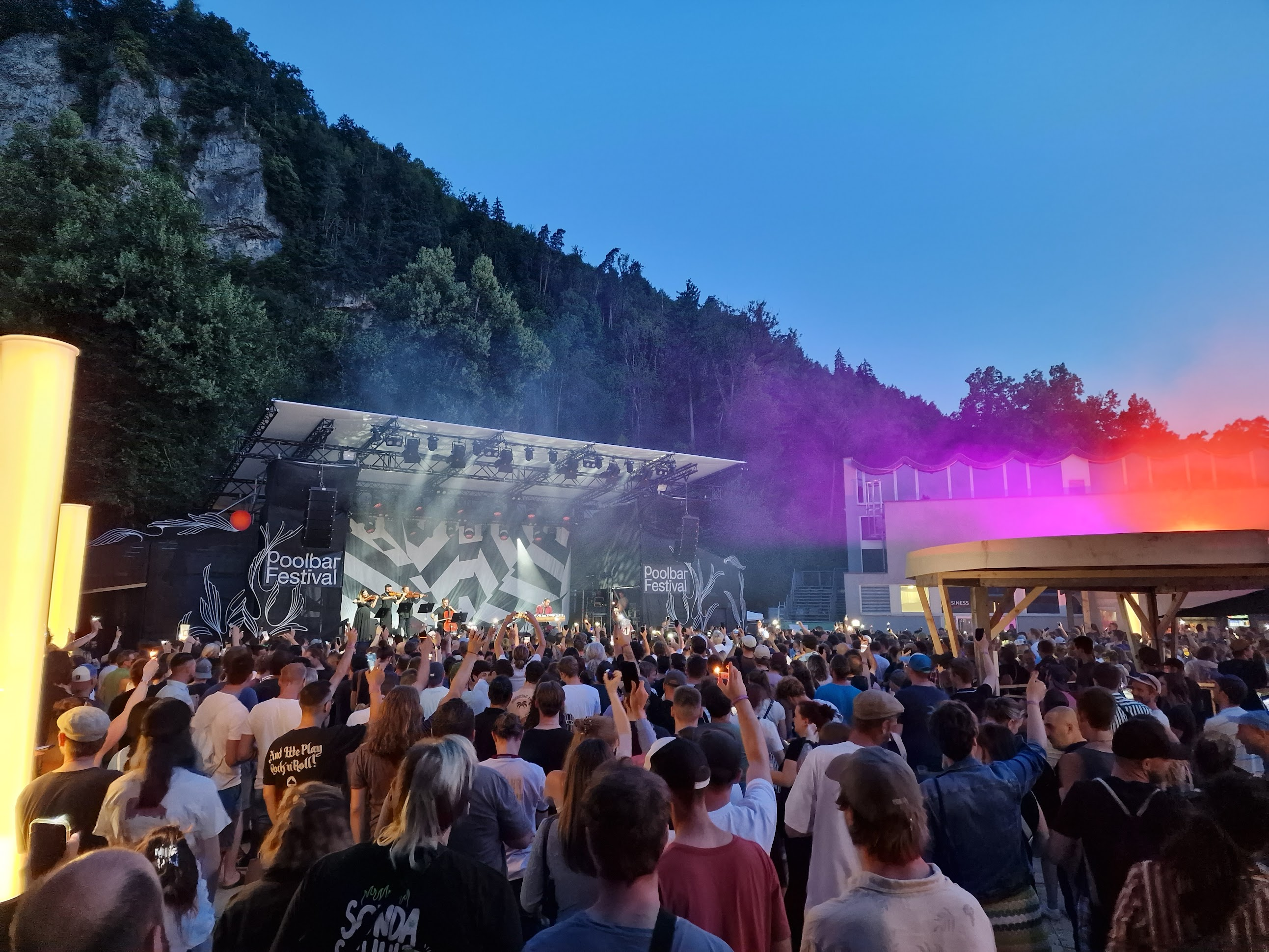
Danger Dan at the Poolbar Festival 2023

The Poolbar Festival is a modern music and culture festival in Feldkirch. Being held annually between July and August, it attracts around 20,000 visitors featuring music, exhibitions, poetry slams, fashion and an architectural prize.

The annual Schubertiade in Schwarzenberg is the most important Franz Schubert festival worldwide. A Schubertiade is usually dominated by Franz Schubert or his compositions. It is an informal meeting where casual music is played or recited by friends clubs or musicians, both on a professional and amateur level. The first Schubertiade took place in Hohenems in Vorarlberg in 1976.

Every year in August, about 30 international short films are screened at the Alpinale Short Film Festival in Bludenz. The Literaturfest Kleinwalsertal is a literary festival consisting of lectures, workshops, poetry slams and exhibitions and takes place in autumn.

The Walserherbst is a 3-week-festival in the Biosphere Park Großwalsertal. The festival is held every other year in August and September and offers a wide cultural programme from music to theater and cinema.

The light art festival Lichtstadt Feldkirch lets international artists fill the city of Feldkirch with light objects, projections and sculptures. Its first edition was held in 2018 and attracted 30.000 visitors. The festival takes place every other year.

The FAQ Bregenzerwald is a social forum in the form of a festival. Hosting lectures, panel discussions, concerts, guided walks as well as culinary tastings, it aims at highlighting social issues in the society in a very broad context.

The Montforter Zwischentöne is an interdisciplinary festival in Feldkirch that takes place three times a year. Each series is based on a specific topic which is artistically and dramaturgically interpreted without genre-orientated boundaries. There are contributions from the fields of music, poetry, architecture, science, dance etc. The festival addresses issues of social and personal development on site and provides impetus for urban and regional development.

Tanzcafé Arlberg is a series of concerts taking place at ski huts in Lech/Zürs for two weeks in the springtime. It is intended to entertain skiers aside the ski piste by providing live music to dance to. The concerts range from pop to swing to rock'n'roll and to ska. The series of events includes a workshop on Lindy Hop.

Bezau Beatz is a music festival that has been taking place in Bezau in August since 2008.

The Bludenzer Tage zeitgemäßer Musik is a festival of contemporary music in Bludenz that was founded in 1988. The aim of the festival is to make contemporary music audible in Bludenz.

Furthermore, Vorarlberg is host to a variety of fairs, conventions and expositions including the public health event Medicinicum Lech, the literary festival Literaricum Lech, the annual interdisciplinary symposium Philosophicum Lech as well as the design fair and festival POTENTIALe in Feldkirch.

=== Museums ===
The most visited museums in Vorarlberg are the Kunsthaus Bregenz, the vorarlberg museum, inatura (interactive nature adventure show and natural history museum) in Dornbirn and the Jewish Museum of Hohenems. Smaller museums include the Angelika Kauffmann Museum in Schwarzenberg, the Hittisau Women's Museum, the Rolls-Royce Museum and Mohren Biererlebniswelt in Dornbirn, the Egg Museum in Egg and the Juppenwerkstatt Riefensberg (manufacturer of traditional women's garb), the Franz Michael Felder museum in Schoppernau, the Schattenburg museum and the Heimatmuseum Bezau.

The Wälderbähnle or Bregenzerwald Museumsbahn (Bregenzerwald Railway) is a narrow-gauge heritage railway that today links Schwarzenberg to Bezau amidst picturesque alpine scenery. The International Rhine Regulation Railway, once an industrial railway used for the straightening of the Alpine Rhine, is also a heritage railway today.

For an overview, see List of museums in Vorarlberg.

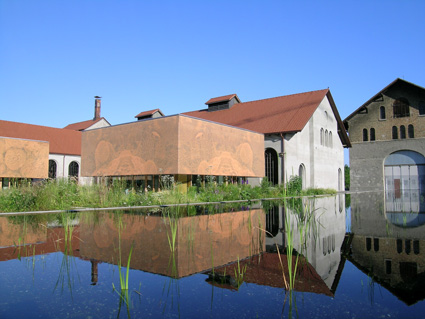
The inatura museum

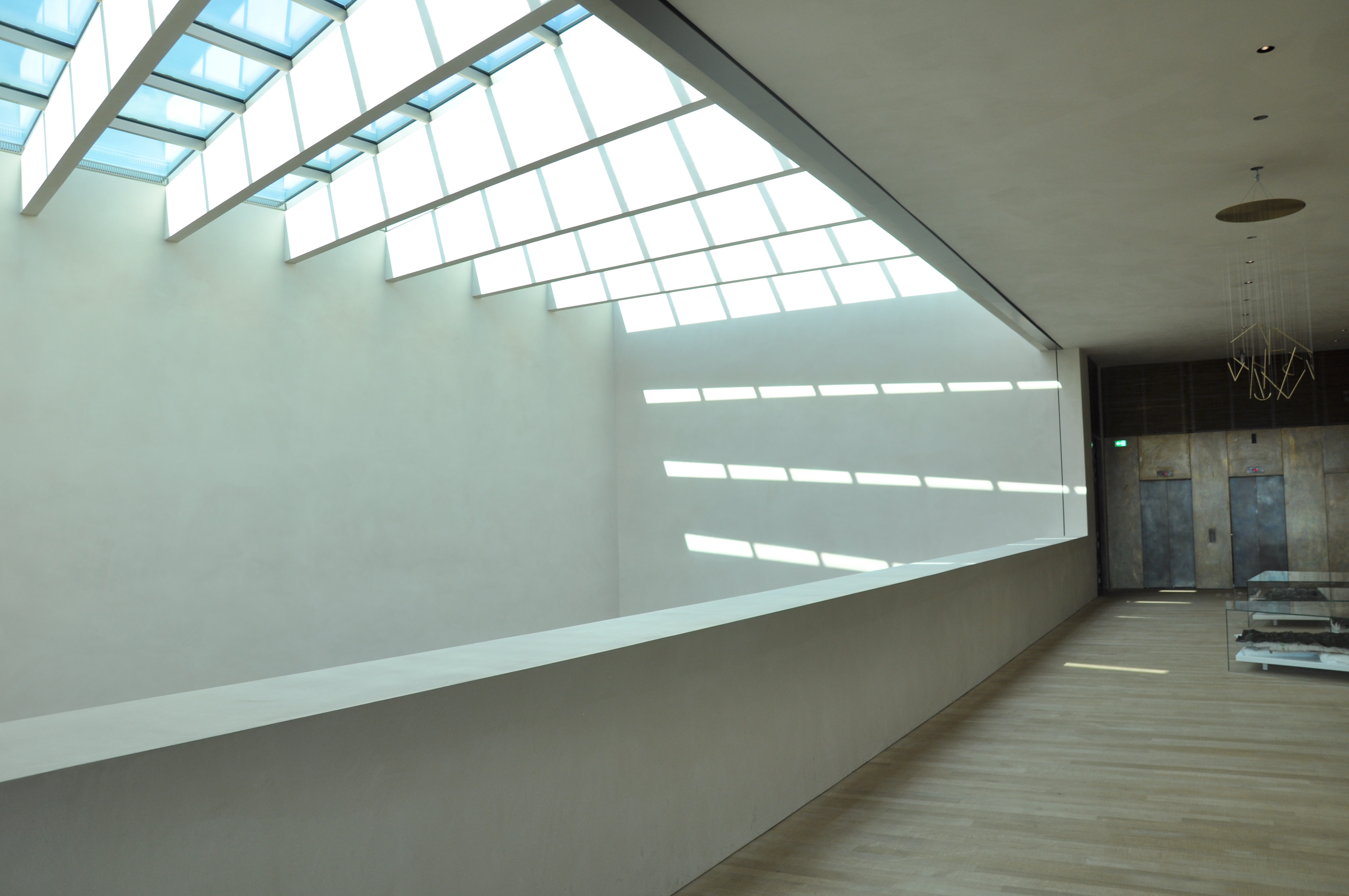
Inside the vorarlberg museum

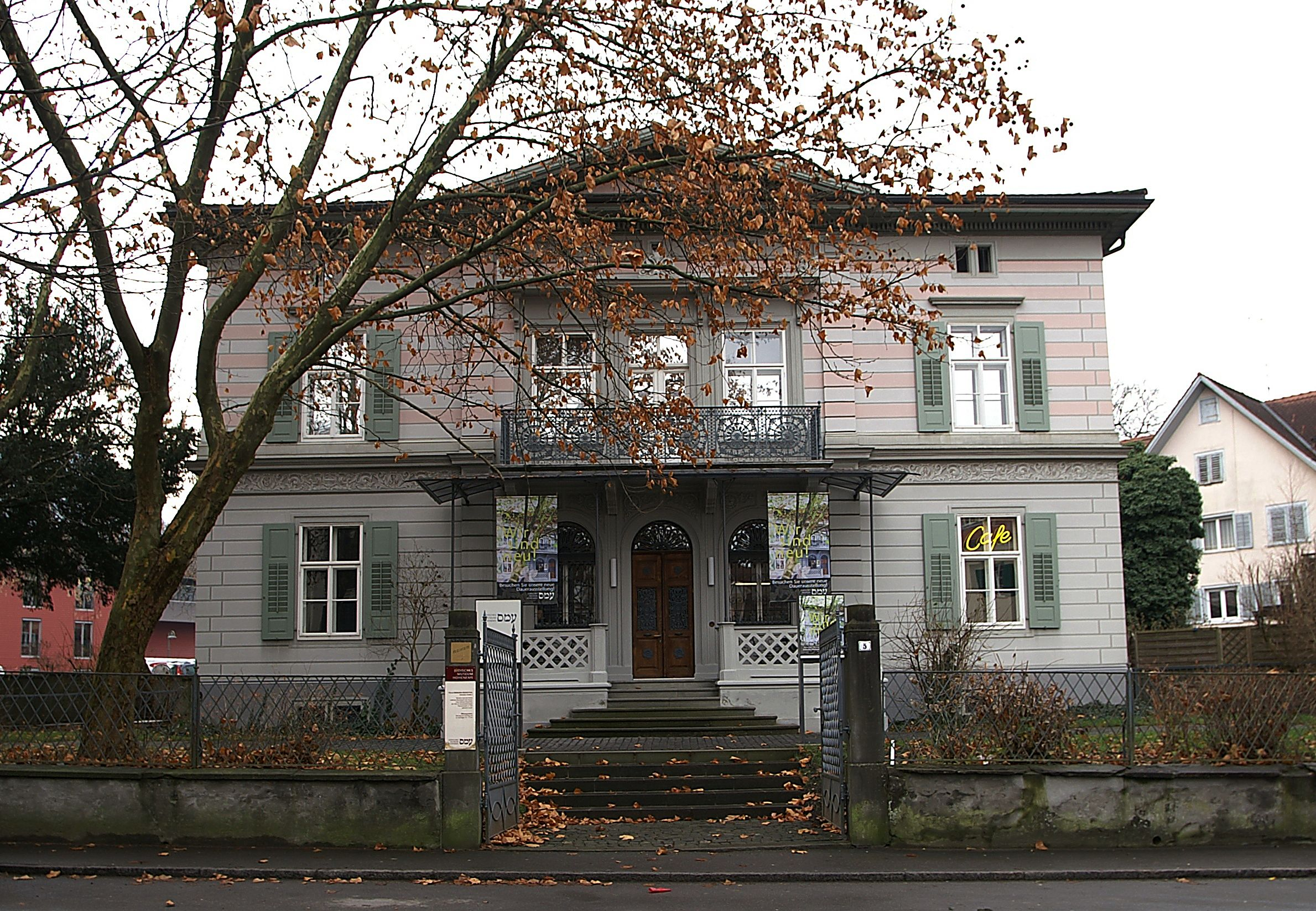
Jewish museum of Hohenems

=== Architecture ===
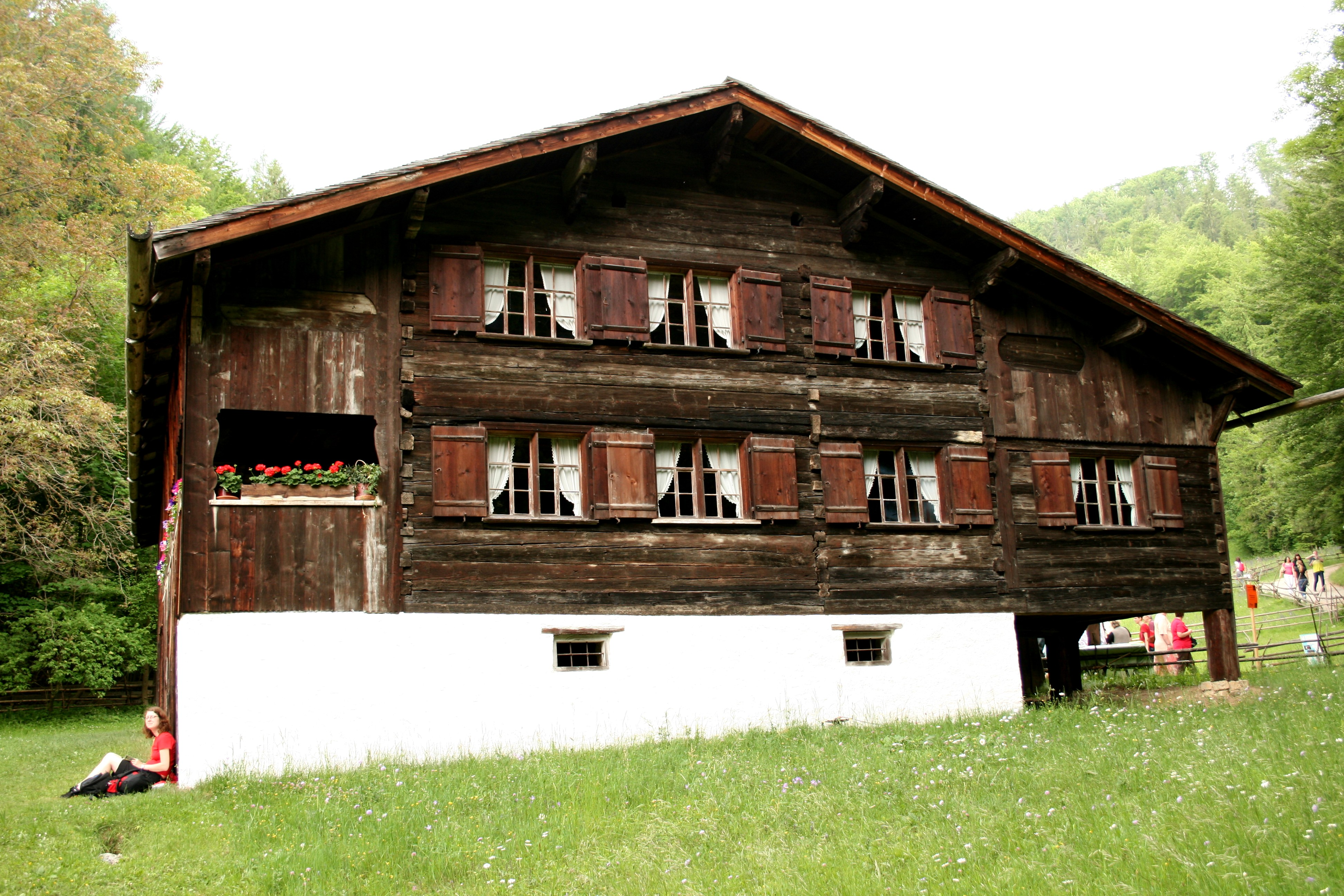
Bregenzerwälderhaus in Stübing

==== The baroque masters of the Guild of Au in the 17th/18th century ====
In 1651, Michael Beer founded the Auer Zunft (Guild of Au) which is an important community of Vorarlberg builders, sculptors and carpenters who specialized in baroque building. In Au-Schoppernau from 1670 to 1700, more than 90 percent of all male workers were builders. Master builders and craftsmen from the Bregenz Forest in particular, but also from other parts of today's Vorarlberg, played a leading role in the 600 churches and monasteries that were built in the Baroque style in the 17th and 18th centuries.

The master craftsmen of Au trained over 1,800 apprentices during a long construction boom which followed the Thirty Years' War. These new master builders were active throughout the Lake Constance area, but also in Alsace, Bohemia and the South German region. Well-known works by baroque master builders include the monasteries and churches in Birnau, Weingarten and Einsiedeln.

Many important members of the Auer Zunft came from the architect families Beer, Moosbrugger and Thumb.

==== Traditional architecture ====
The independent architecture of the Bregenzerwälderhaus, the Montafonerhaus, the Rheintalhaus from the Dornbirn region and the "Walserhaus" are particularly relevant to historical architecture. Their designs trace back to the 15th century. The traditional materials used for building these houses are stone and wood. They are important features of the mountainous Alpine landscape.

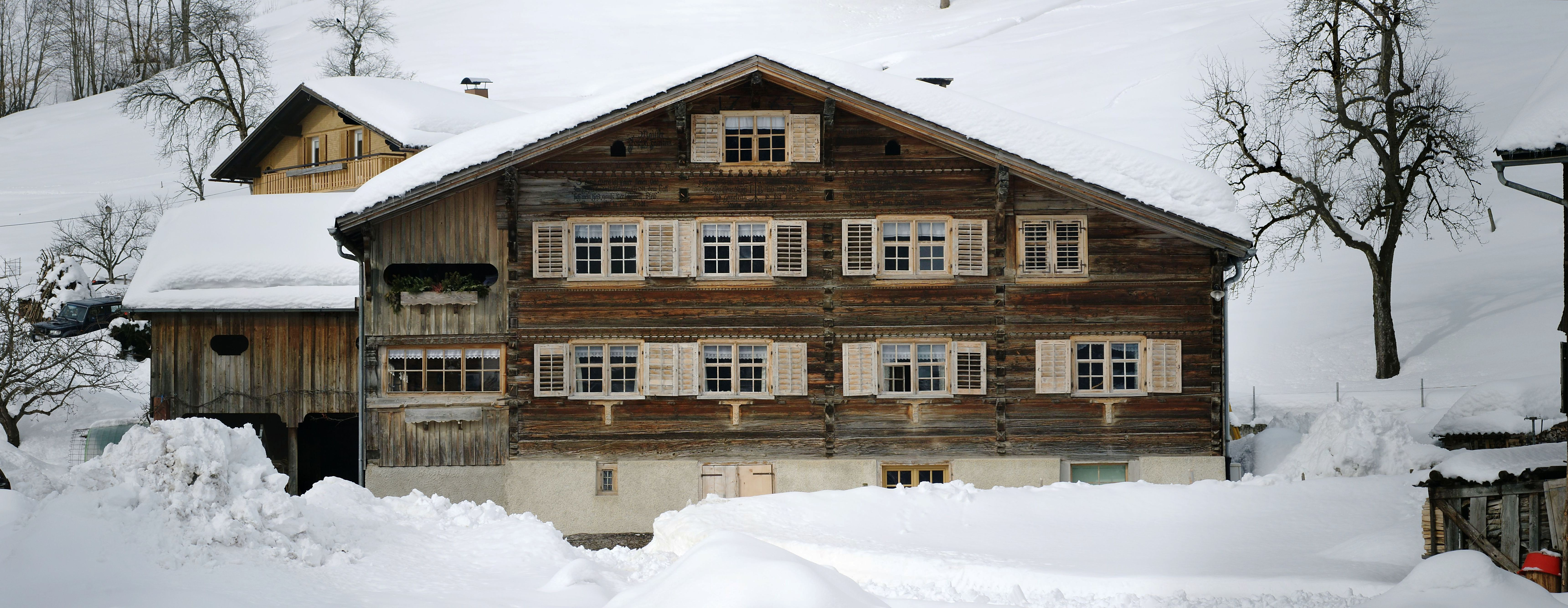
Bregenzerwälderhaus in Schwarzenberg

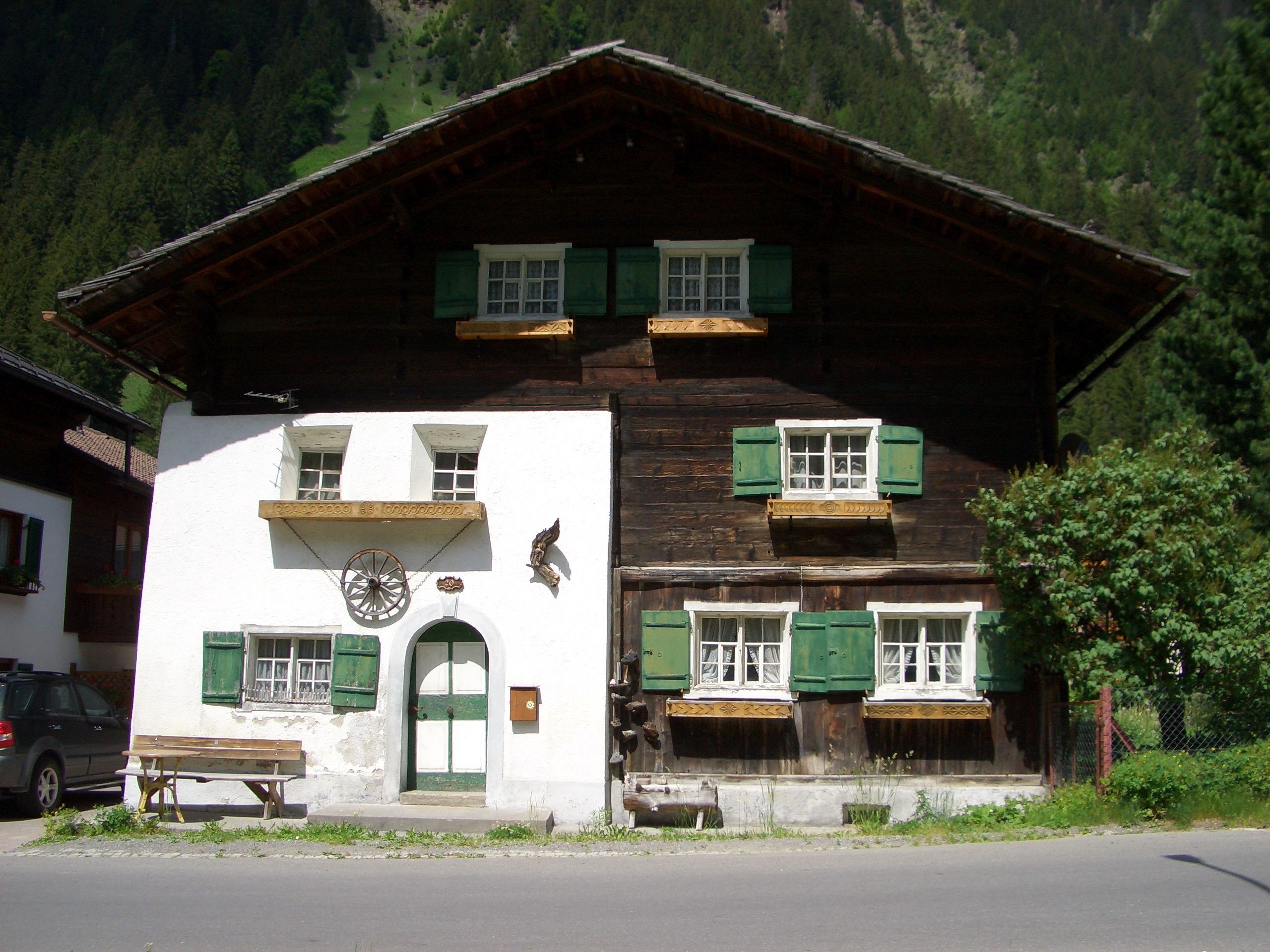
Montafonerhaus in Partenen

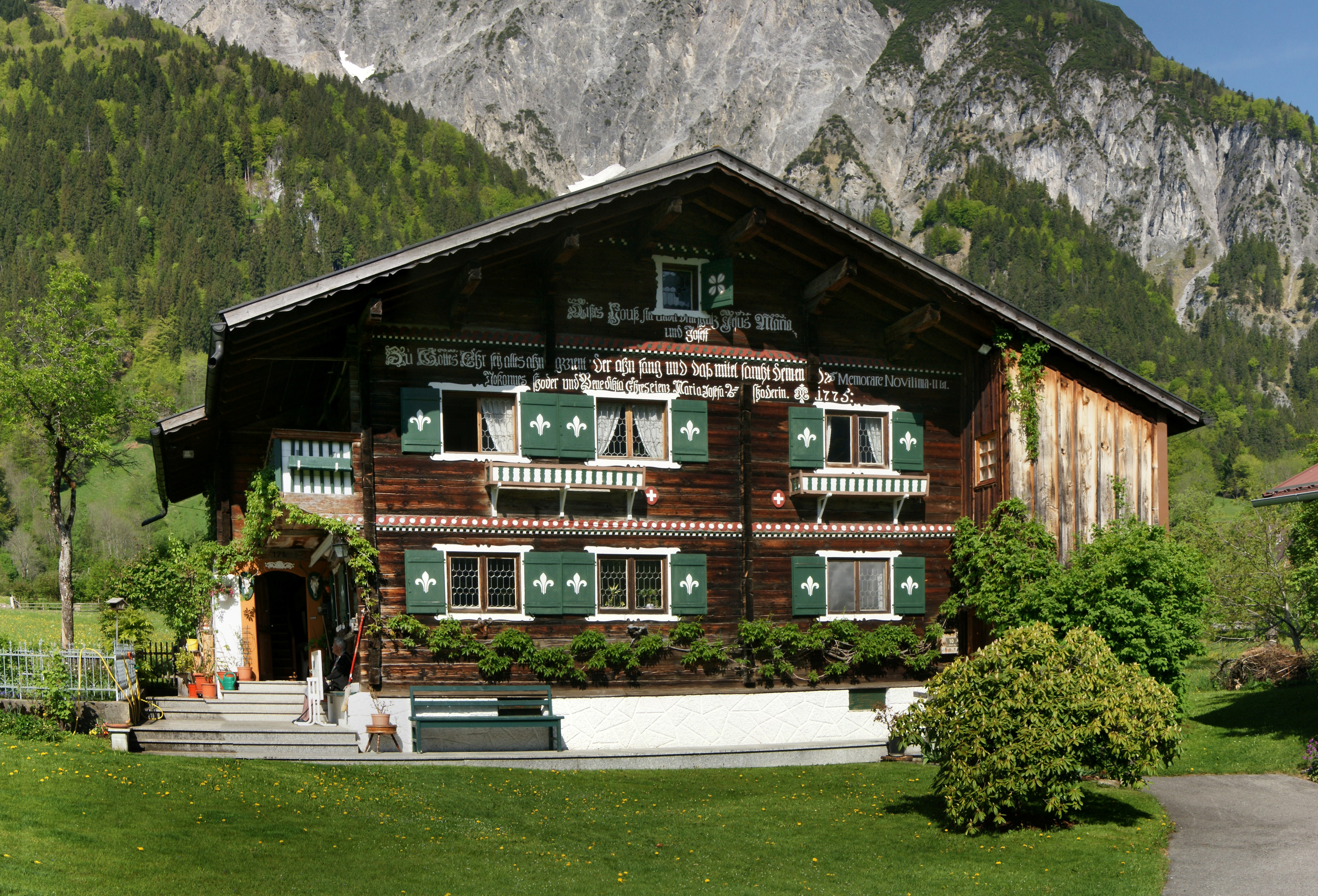
Walserhaus in Vandans

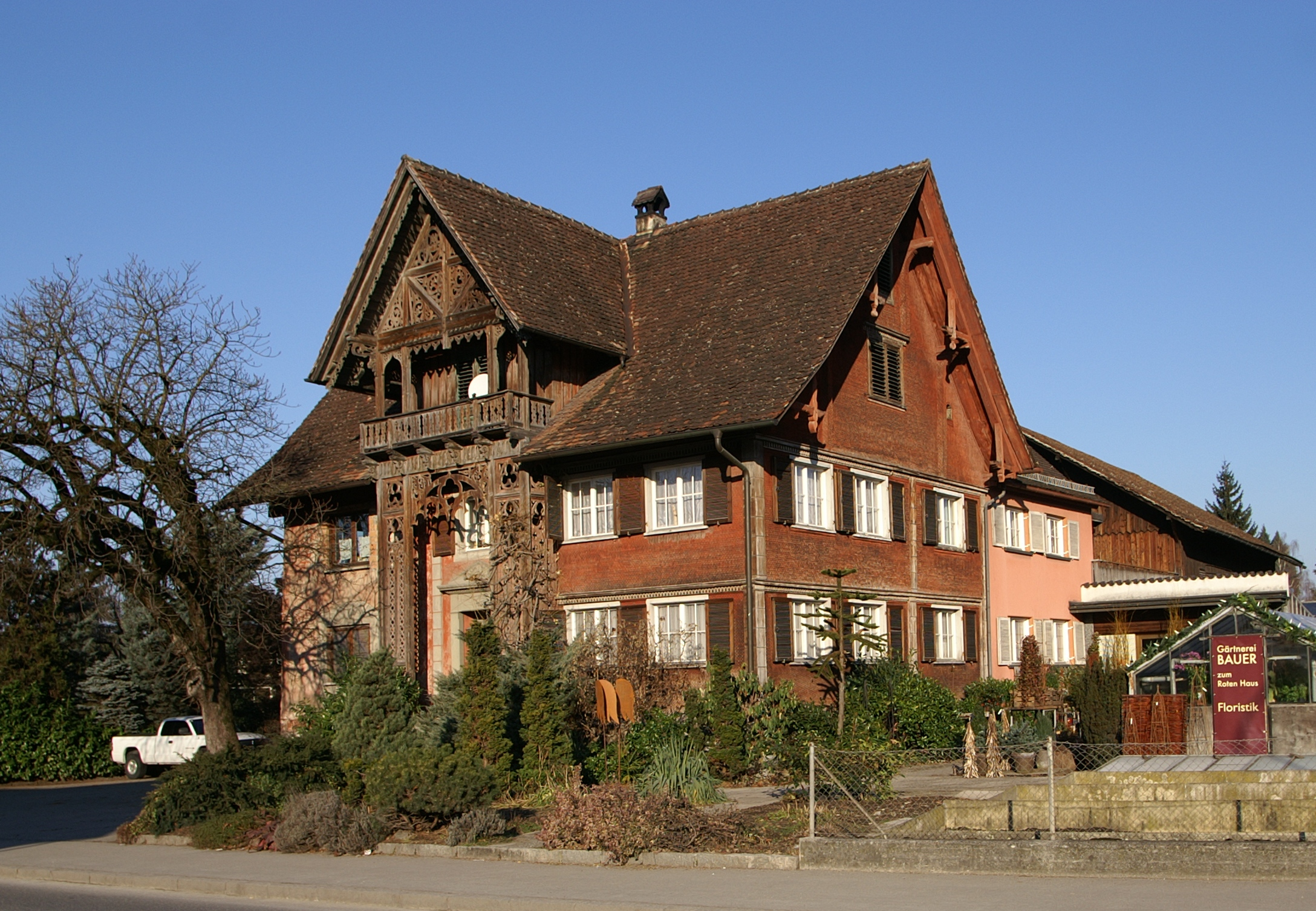
Rheintalhaus in Rankweil

==== Art Nouveau ====
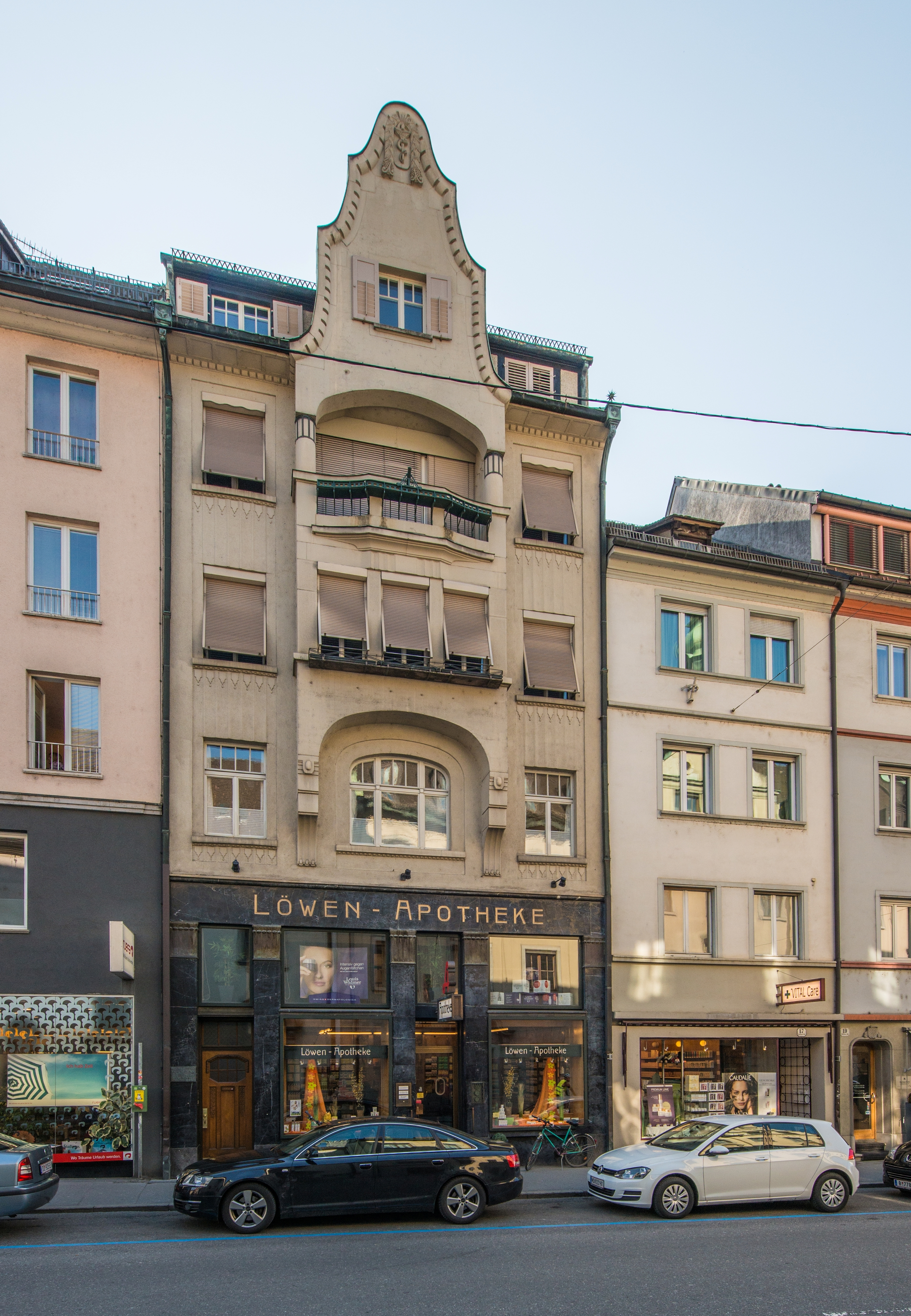
The Art Nouveau Löwenapotheke in Bregenz

The style that dominated in Vorarlberg at the turn of the century is characterised by the "Heimatstil", the Southern German variant of Art Nouveau. An example for this style is the Löwenapotheke in the Rathausstraße in Bregenz by Otto Mallaun. Other notable representatives of Art Nouveau architecture in Vorarlberg are: Ernst Dittrich in Feldkirch (e.g., Feldkirch's Regional Court, State Directorate of Finances) and Hanns Kornberger in Dornbirn (e.g., the mansions "Grabenweg Nr. 8" and "Schulgasse Nr. 17)" and in Hohenems (e.g., the former hospital).

==== Neue Vorarlberger Bauschule and contemporary architecture ====
The Neue Vorarlberger Bauschule evolved organically the second half of the 20th century, always involving craftsmen and locals in the building process. Today, it is regarded as one of the most important pioneers of the New Alpine architecture. With the typical architecture of Vorarlberg still recognizable, it combines tradition and modernity: clean lines, glass and local wood. Its harmonious mix creates interesting contrasts as in half-timbered houses. Comfort and quality of life are important criteria. Currently, many private houses and public buildings are renovated by architects, favoring local timber and limiting energy expenditure. Well-known award-winning architectural projects include the Kunsthaus Bregenz, vorarlberg museum in Bregenz, Michelehof Hard and Hotel Krone Hittisau.

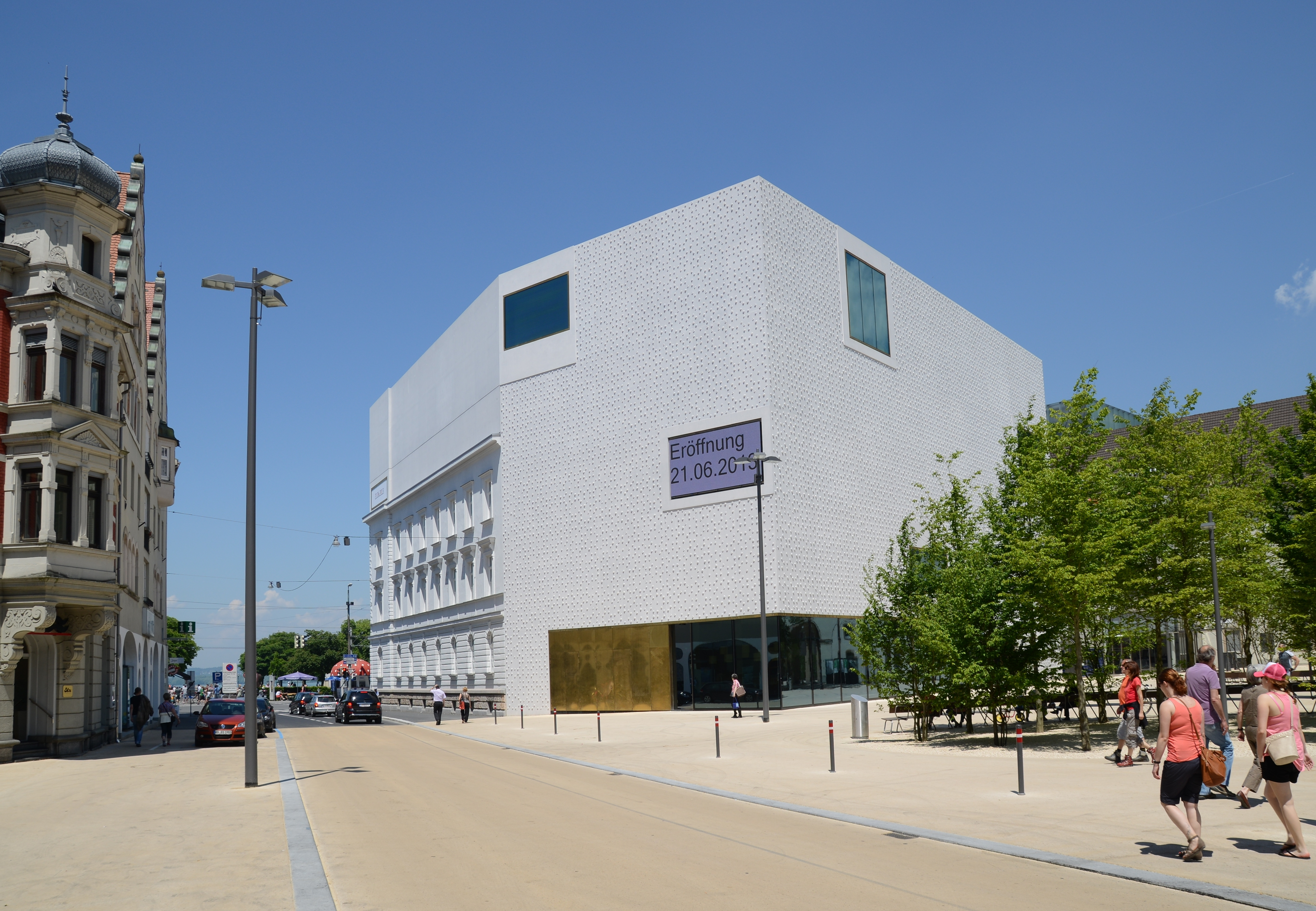
vorarlberg museum in Bregenz

Over the last thirty years [...] Vorarlberg has made a name for itself with its contemporary building culture. Widely considered a unique phenomenon throughout Europe, Vorarlberg has not only established its own regional identity, but also serves as a role model far beyond its own borders. […] The employment of innovative materials and construction principles, the integration of the latest technologies, and the development of new building products play a particularly important role. […] The harmonious collaboration between architects, craftsmen, clients, and the local authorities continues to produce new architecture which is progressive, energy-efficient, and sustainable, and has earned Vorarlberg a widely admired reputation in the international design community.

— Ulrich Dangel (2010), Sustainable Architecture in Vorarlberg: Energy Concepts and Construction Systems

Contemporary architecture in Vorarlberg has made a label for a demanding architecture of a fruitful confrontation between traditional construction and modern interpretation. Some examples of more recent architecture are:

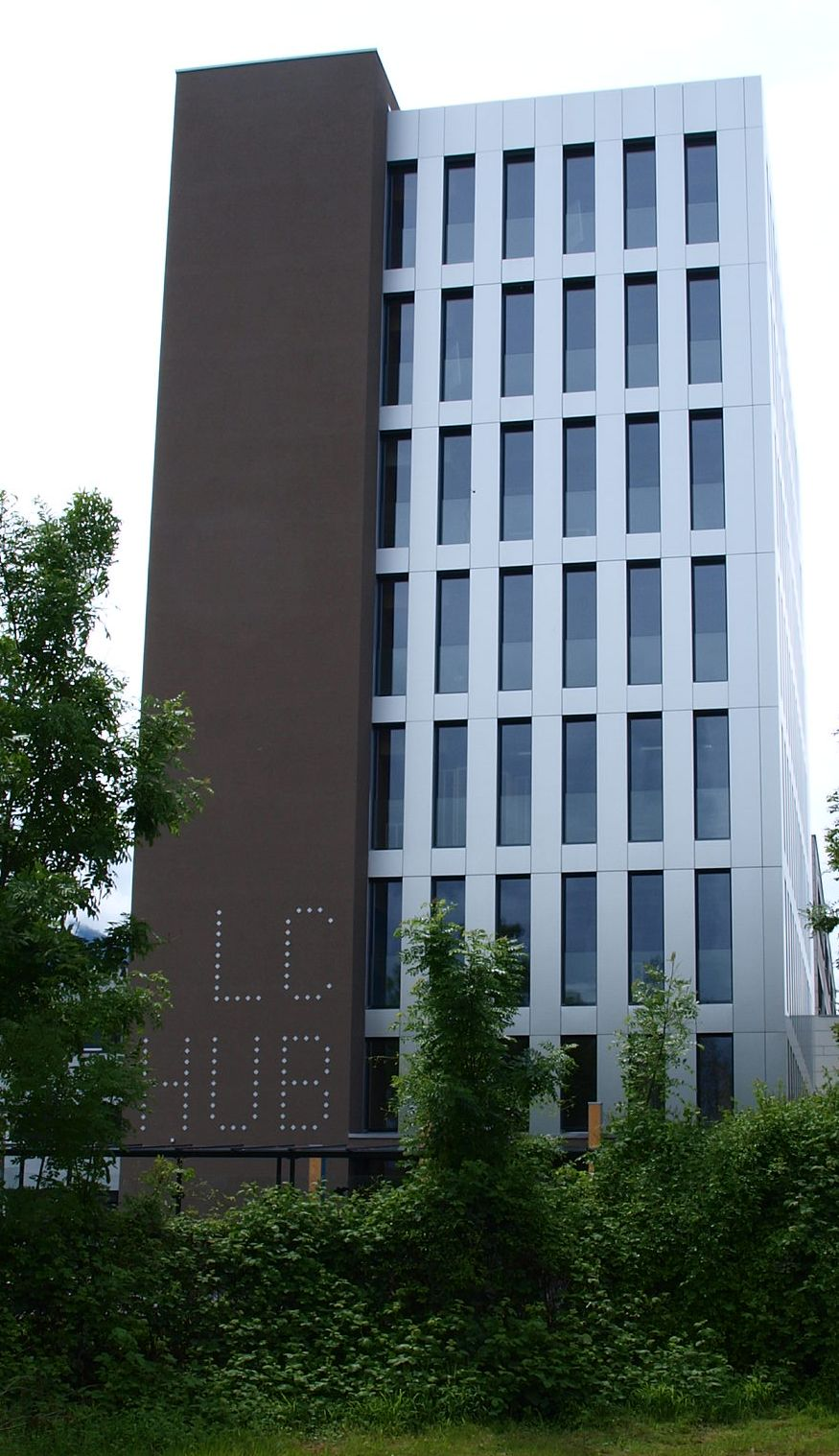
The sustainable and modular LCT ONE (LifeCycle One Tower) in Dornbirn

- vorarlberg museum in Bregenz: The museum by Cukrowicz Nachbaur Architekten was awarded the International Architecture Award 2014, Best Architect's Award 2014 in gold, Vorarlberg Client Award 2015, Austrian Museum Award 2016, among others.
- Kunsthaus Bregenz: The Kunsthaus was built by the Swiss architect and Pritzker Prize winner Peter Zumthor, received the Mies van der Rohe Award in 1998.
- LifeCycle-Tower ONE (LCT ONE) in Dornbirn: From 2010 onwards, Vorarlberg had been investing in research on renewable energy sources and energy-efficient houses in order to achieve self-set climate targets. In 2012, the first modular wooden hybrid complex of eight floors was built: the LifeCycle-Tower I. It is 27 m high and made of wood and concrete. In this architectural design, load-bearing elements are not covered. The benefits of this innovative project are environmental and energy efficiency, 90% less CO_{2} emissions, a much shorter construction and industrial production time of the components.
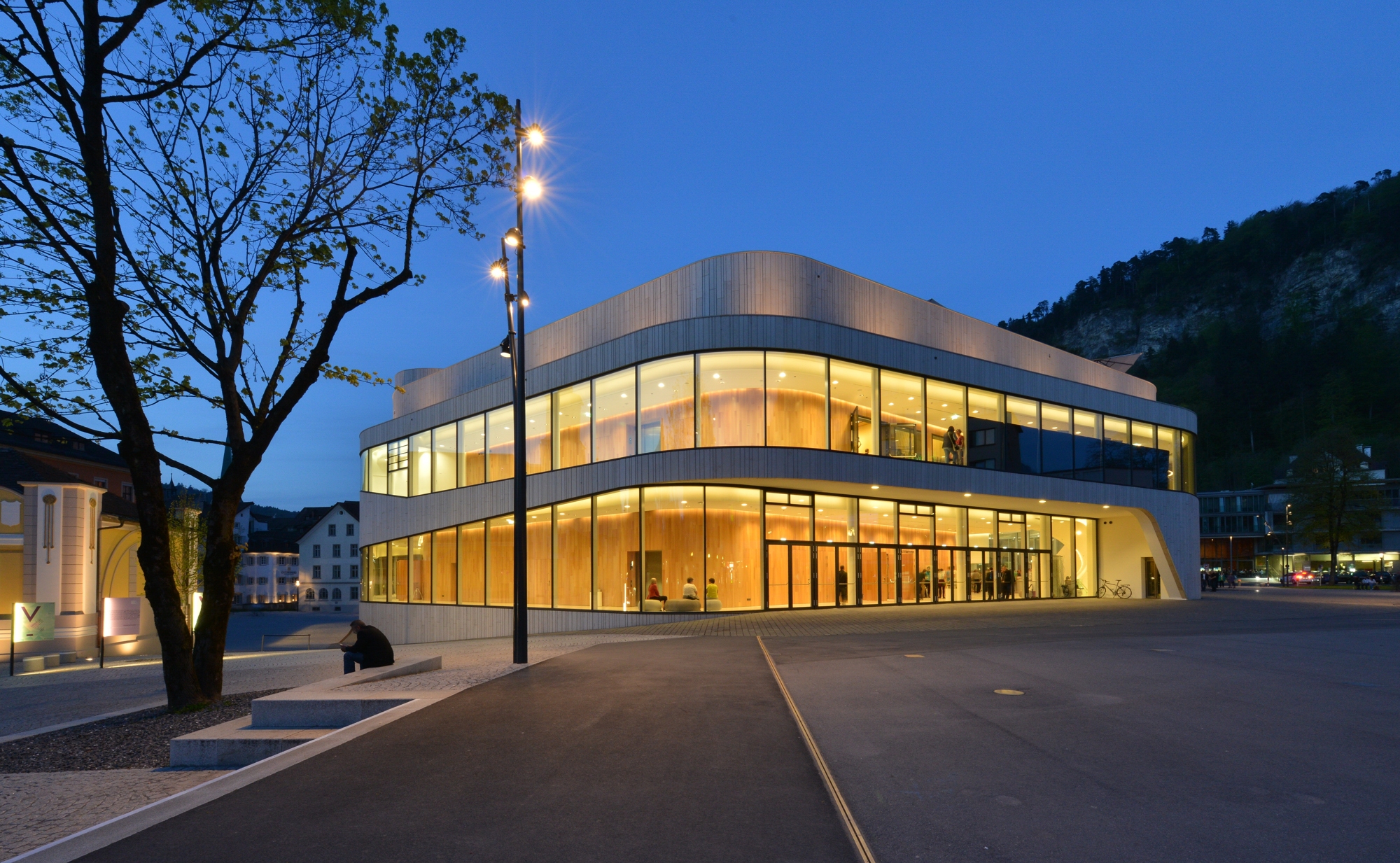
- The Montforthaus in Feldkirch is a public venue for cultural events.
  BUS:STOP project in Krumbach: In 2014, the municipality of Krumbach in the Bregenz Forest constructed seven bus stops that were designed by international architect offices in partnership with local partner architects and craftsmen. The project goes under the name of BUS:STOP Krumbach. These extraordinary bus stops received special recognition as part of the Austrian National Architecture Awards as well as the National Award for PR.
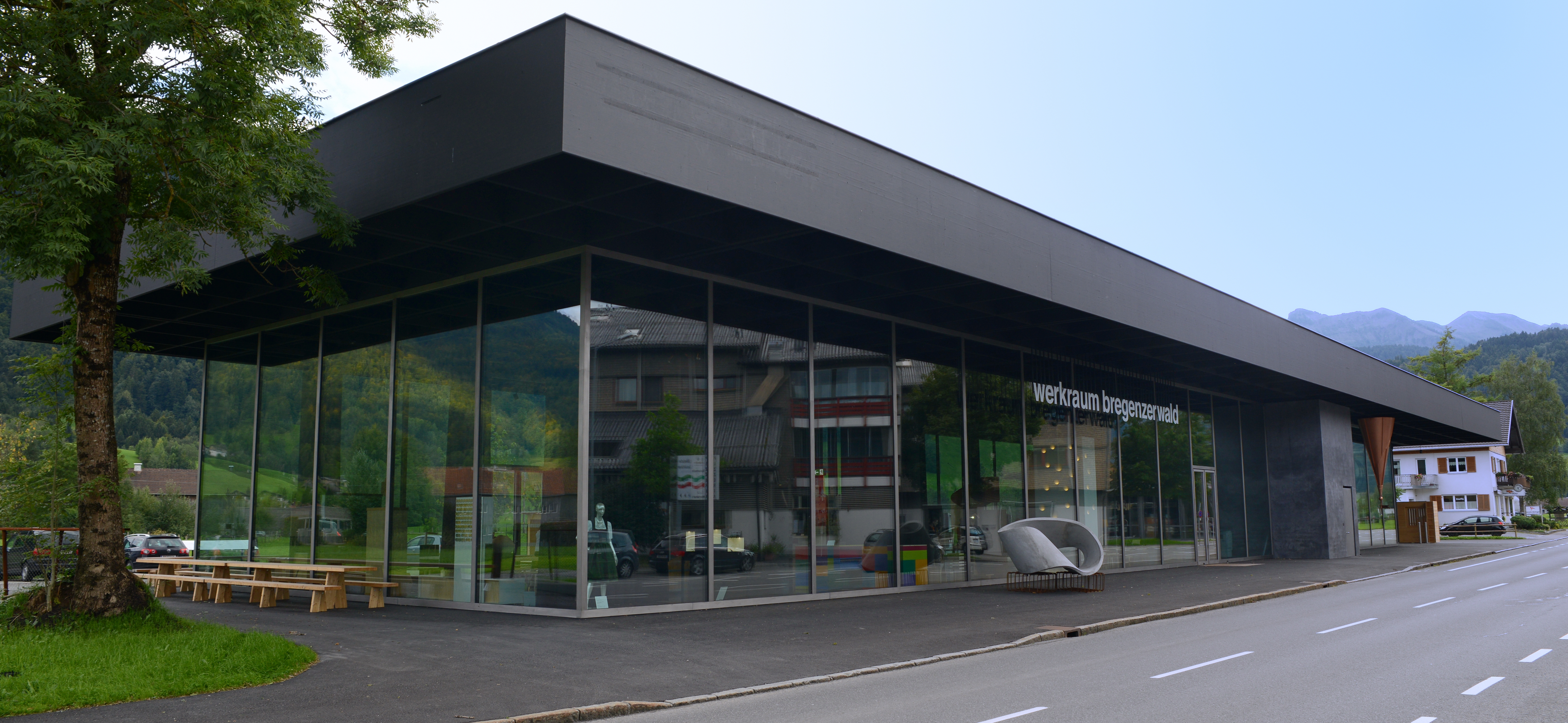
- Werkraum Bregenzerwald: designed by Peter Zumthor, opened in 2013
  Skyspace Lech in Oberlech: A skyspace is an enclosed space which is open to the sky through a large hole in the ceiling. The architectural design puts the colour-changing light at the walls and in the sky during sunrise and sunset into focus. The Skyspace Lech is a walk-in art installation by James Turrell in Oberlech.
- Montforthaus Feldkirch: The convention centre was re-opened in 2015. The Montforthaus is a public venue for balls, conventions, concerts and theatre performances.

==== Architectural initiatives ====
The Werkraum Bregenzerwald is an association of craftsmen in the Bregenzerwald founded in 1999. It aims at networking and supporting craft, design and technology businesses in the area. The publicly accessible place is used to present the craftsmanship, to promote building culture in cooperation with architects and to increase design competence and quality of craftsmanship with the preferred involvement of young people.

Occupying the Werkraum Bregenzerwald since 2014, the travelling exhibition Getting Things Done demonstrates the quality of Vorarlberg's architecture by means of 230 selected projects. It offers a distinct view of how building culture has evolved from the late 1950s until the present. Organized by the Austrian Cultural Forum network, the exhibition will be shown in over 20 locations around the world.

==== Architecture trails ====
The Vorarlberg Institute for Architecture (VAI) and the Vorarlberg Tourist Board collaborated for the development of the so-called architecture trails. Each trail has a different theme: "New impressions", "Art and culture", "Timber and loam", "Old and new", "Revitalised villages" and "Architecture and landscape". These tours take visitors to both urban and rural regions in order to illustrate architectural variety in Vorarlberg by select examples. These examples are characterized by a functional mix, spatial versatility, formal radicalism, ecological far-sightedness and social integration.

== Sporting events ==
=== Winter ===
The White Ring is a ski race in the Ski Arlberg ski area. In 2009, the Guinness World Records confirmed that the White Ring is the longest ski area in the world at 22 km. It consists of 5 runs, 6 lifts and a cross-country trail.

In the season 2012/13, the first SBX World Cup Montafon was held as part of the FIS Snowboard World Cup. The World Cup takes place annually in December in the Montafon valley. The races are held in the Silvretta Montafon ski area, starting a little below the Hochjoch summit and finishing near the cable car's mountain station. The difference in altitude between start and finish is around 200 m.

The first Open Faces Freeride Contest took place in 2017. The most previous contest was held from 24 to 27 February 2022 in the Silvretta Montafon ski area. The contest was the first 4-star qualifier of the season 2022. The length of the freeride slope is 450 m, its vertical drop is 350 m and it has a steepness of up to 60°.

=== Summer ===
The Hypo-Meeting is an athletics competition which is held annually in May/June in the Mösle stadium in Götzis. It is organised by the International Association of Athletics Federations (IAAF) and sponsored by the Hypo Vorarlberg Bank, thus its name. The first Hypo-Meetings have been organised as contests for men starting in 1975. The women's contests have been added in 1981.

The Montafon-Arlberg Marathon is a mountain marathon with 1,500 meters in altitude in the middle of the European protected area Verwall.

In 2007, Dornbirn hosted the 13th World Gymnaestrada event, in which about 21,000 gymnasts from 56 federations participated. In 2019, Dornbirn hosted the event again, see 16th World Gymnaestrada.

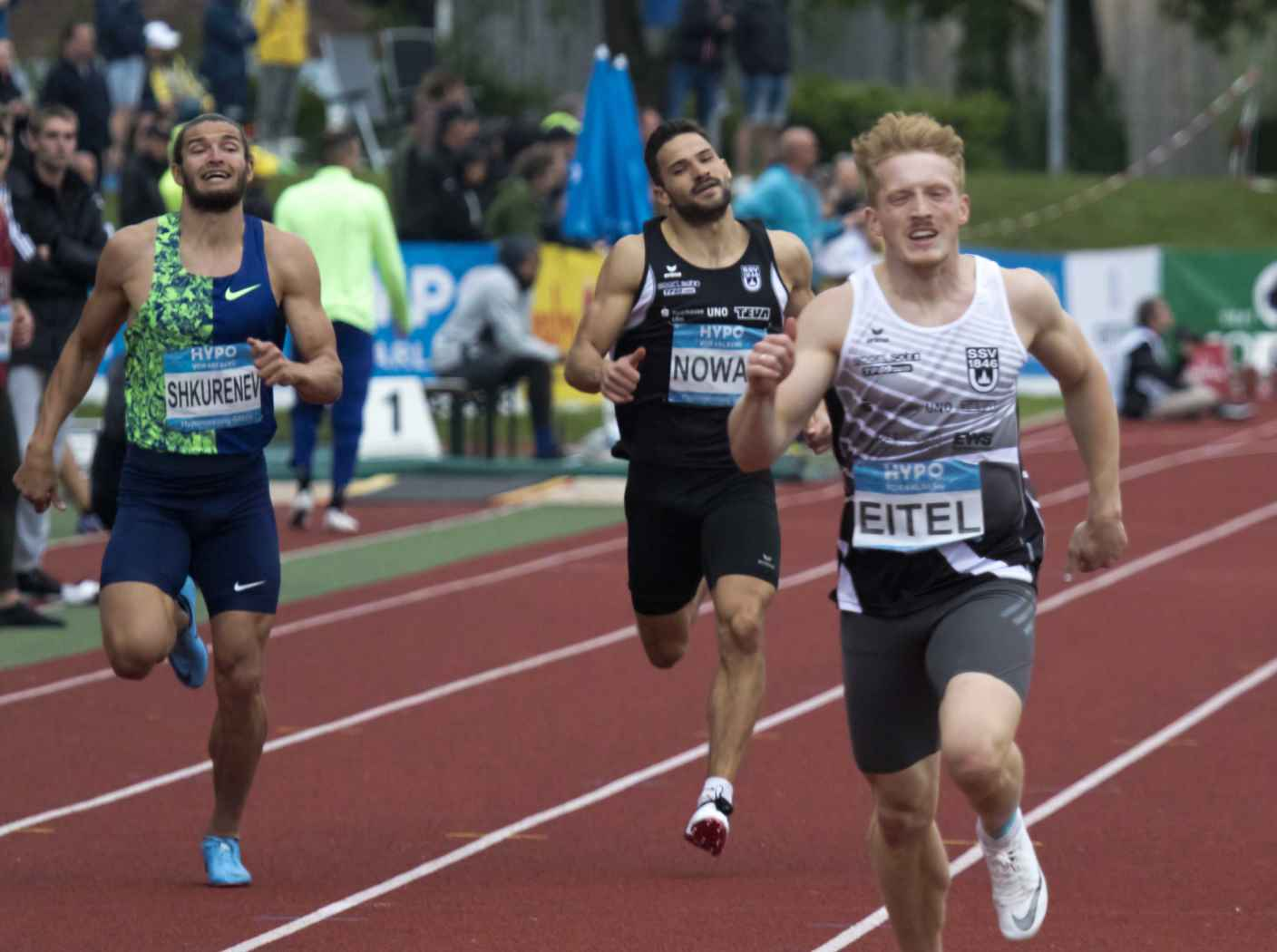
Men's 400 metres race at the 2019 Hypo-Meeting in Götzis

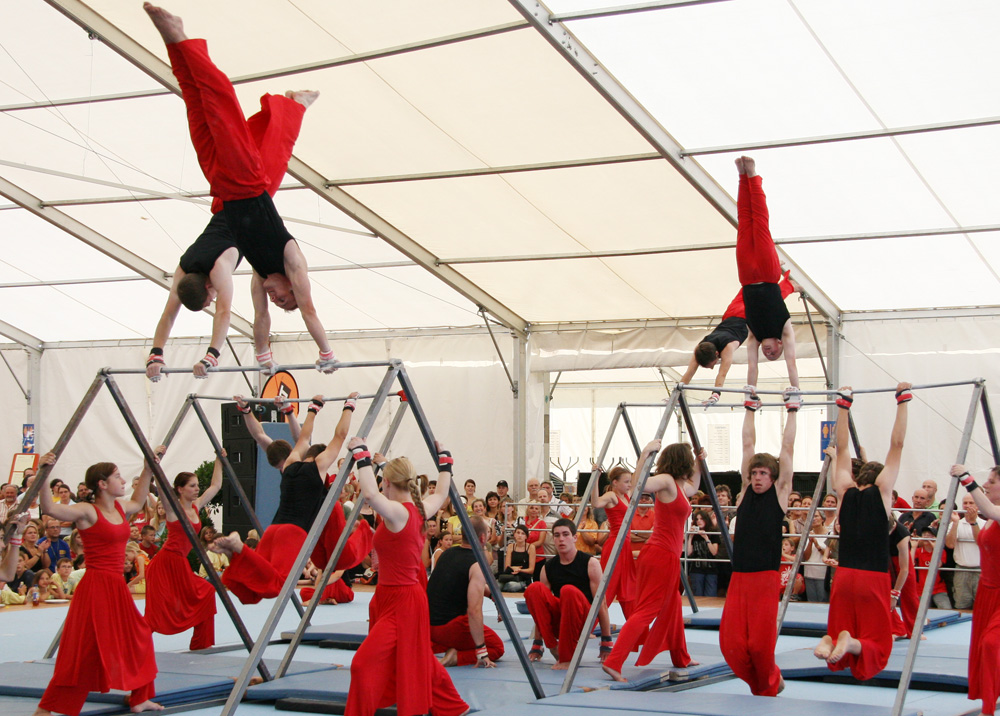
Impression of the 2007 World Gymnaestrada in Vorarlberg

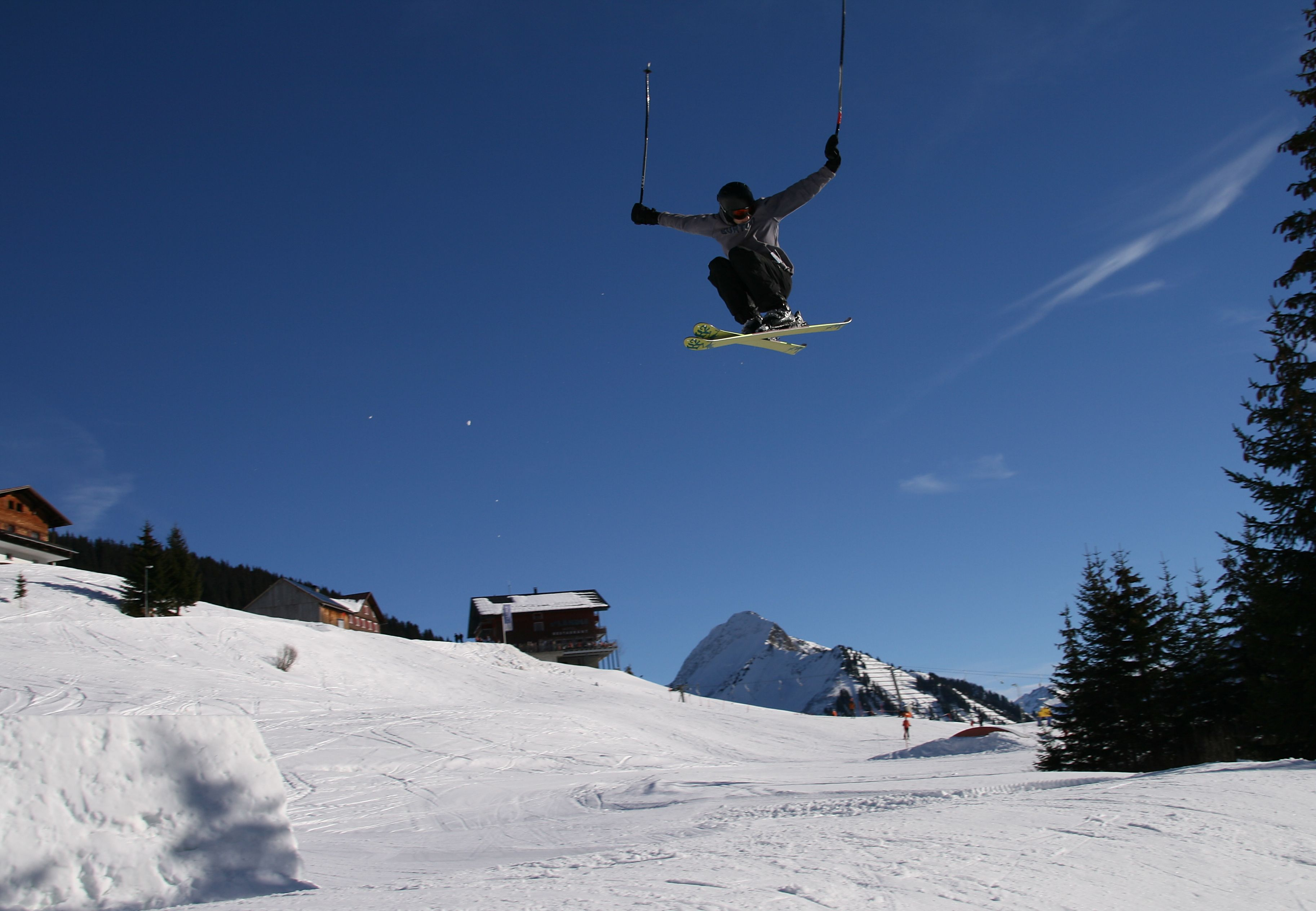
Ski cross skier in Damüls

== Notable people ==
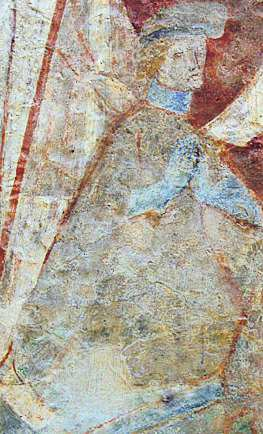
A fresco of Hugo von Montfort from Pfannberg Castle

The following notable people are born in Vorarlberg:

- Franz Anton Beer (1688–1749), baroque master builder
- Lorenz Böhler (1885–1973), surgeon
- Artur Doppelmayr (1922–2017), entrepreneur and cableway pioneer (see Doppelmayr)
- Franz Michael Felder (1839–1869), writer, farmer, social reformer
- Michael Köhlmeier (born 1949), writer
- Hugo von Montfort (1357–1423), an Austrian minstrel
- Patrick Ortlieb (born 1967), alpine ski racer and MP of the FPÖ (1999–2002)
- Stefan Sagmeister (born 1962), graphic designer and typographer
- Hans-Jörg Schelling (born 1953), ÖVP-politician and Austria's Federal Minister of Finance (2014–2017)
- Matthias Strolz (born 1973), NEOS-politician (2013–2018)
- Ingrid Thurnher (born 1962), ORF-anchorwoman
- Hans Weiss (author) born 1950, author, journalist

=== Sport ===
- Wiltrud Drexel (born 1950), alpine ski racer
- Marc Girardelli (born 1963), alpine ski racer
- Katharina Liensberger (born 1997), alpine ski racer
- David Reinbacher (born 2004), ice hockey player
- Marco Rossi (born 2001), ice hockey player
- Christine Scheyer (born 1994), alpine ski racer
- Anita Wachter (born 1967), alpine ski racer

== See also ==
- List of museums in Vorarlberg
