= Lauterach railway station =

Railway station in Vorarlberg, Austria

Lauterach
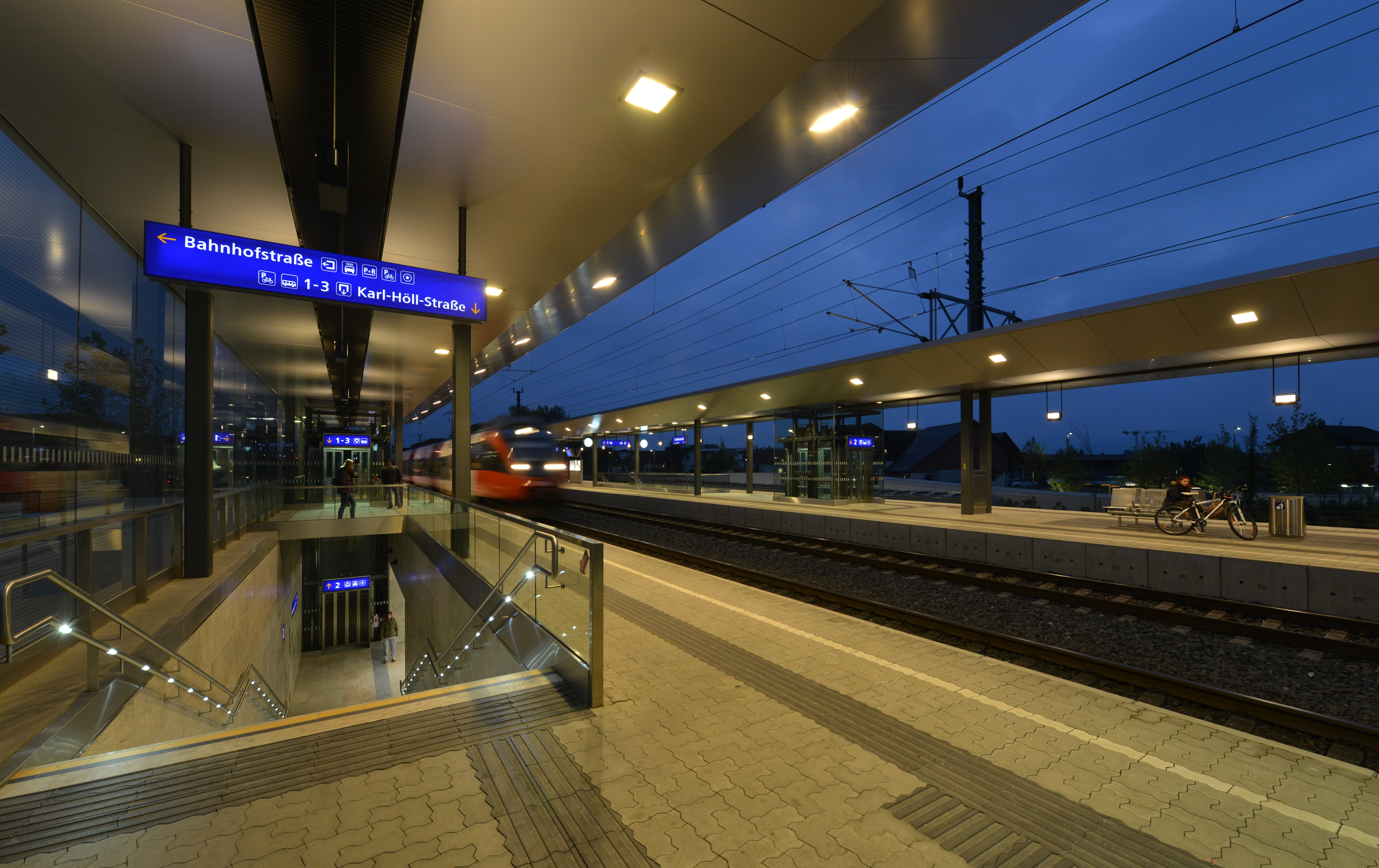
- The station platform in 2015

General information
- Location: Lauterach, Vorarlberg; Austria
- Coordinates: 47°28′35″N 9°43′29″E
- Owner: Austrian Federal Railways (ÖBB)
- Lines: St. Margrethen–Lauterach line; Vorarlberg line
- Distance: 14.2 km (8.8 mi) from Lindau-Insel
- Train operators: ÖBB
- Connections: Landbus Unterland

Services
Preceding station	Vorarlberg S-Bahn	Following station
Wolfurt towards Bludenz	S1	Bregenz Riedenburg towards Lindau-Insel
Wolfurt towards Feldkirch	R5	Hard-Fussach towards St. Margrethen
Location
- Location within Austria Location within Vorarlberg

Lauterach railway station (German: Bahnhof Lauterach) is a railway station in the town of Lauterach in the district of Bregenz in the Austrian state of Vorarlberg. It sits at the junction of the standard gauge Vorarlberg and St. Margrethen–Lauterach lines of Austrian Federal Railways (ÖBB).

== Services ==
As of the December 2021 timetable change, the following services stop at Lauterach:

- Vorarlberg S-Bahn
  - S1: half-hourly service between Bludenz and Bregenz Hafen, with some trains continuing to Lindau-Insel.
  - R5: on weekdays, seven trains per day to St. Margrethen, six to Dornbirn, three to Feldkirch.
