= Bregenz Riedenburg railway station =

Railway station in Vorarlberg, Austria

Bregenz Riedenburg
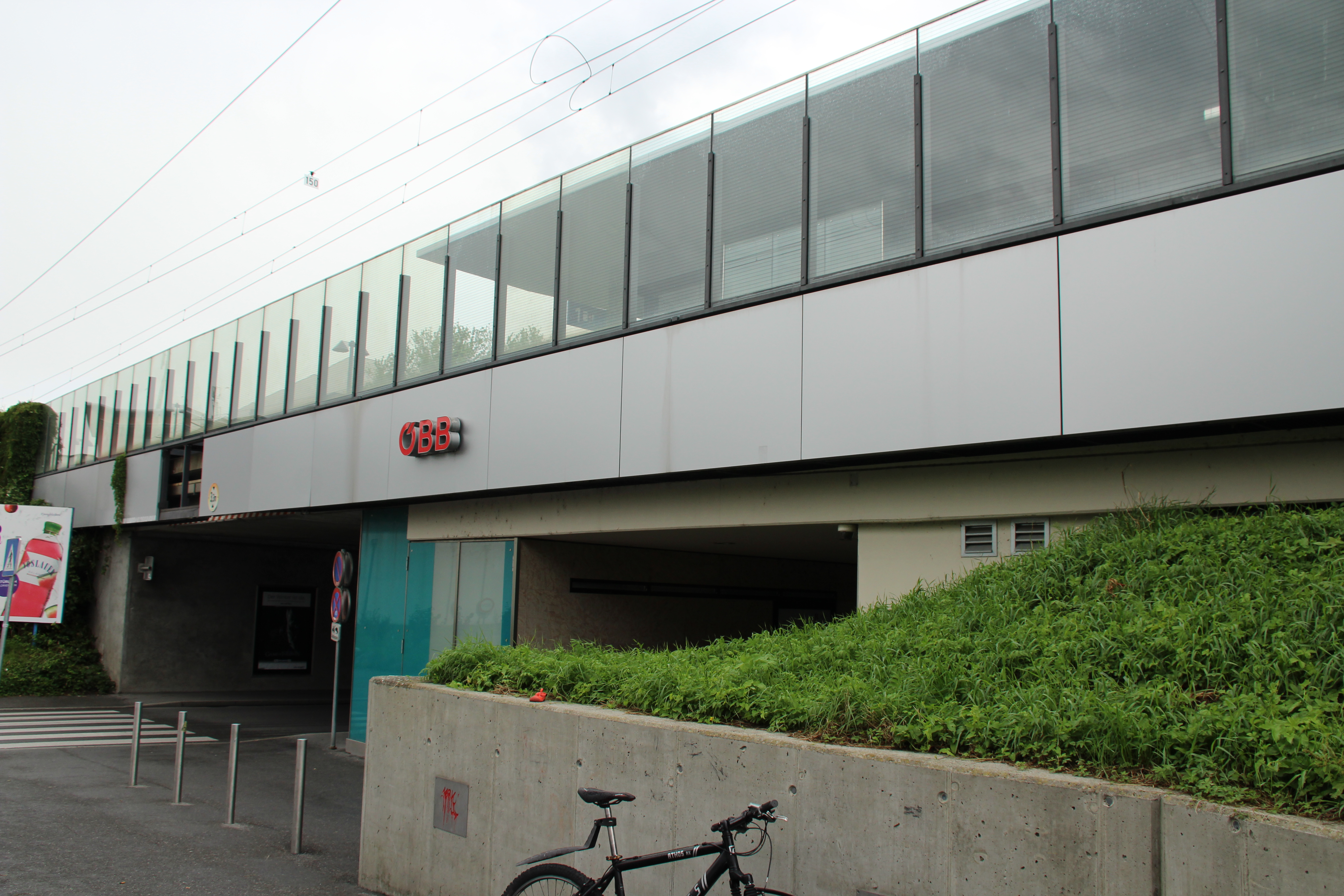
- The station in 2017

General information
- Location: Bregenz; Austria
- Coordinates: 47°29′37″N 9°43′16″E
- Owner: Austrian Federal Railways (ÖBB)
- Lines: St. Margrethen–Lauterach line; Vorarlberg line
- Train operators: ÖBB

Services
Preceding station	ÖBB	Following station
Dornbirn towards Bludenz	REX 1	Bregenz towards Lindau-Insel
Preceding station		Following station
Dornbirn toward Wien Westbahnhof	WESTbahn	Bregenz toward Lindau-Insel
Preceding station	Vorarlberg S-Bahn	Following station
Lauterach towards Bludenz	S1	Bregenz towards Lindau-Insel
Lauterach Unterfeld towards St. Margrethen	S3	Bregenz Terminus
Location
- Location within Austria Location within Vorarlberg

Bregenz Riedenburg railway station (German: Haltestelle Bregenz Riedenburg), also known as Riedenburg railway station, is a railway station in the town of Bregenz, the capital of the district of Bregenz in the Austrian state of Vorarlberg. It sits at the junction of the standard gauge Vorarlberg and St. Margrethen–Lauterach lines of Austrian Federal Railways (ÖBB).

== Services ==
The following services stop at Bregenz Riedenburg:

- WESTbahn green: one train per day and direction to Lindau-Insel and Wien Westbahnhof.
- REX 1: hourly to half-hourly service between Feldkirch and Lindau-Insel; many trains continue from Feldkirch to Bludenz.
- Vorarlberg S-Bahn:
  - S1: half-hourly service to Bludenz and Bregenz Hafen, with some trains continuing to Lindau-Insel.
  - S3: half-hourly service to St. Margrethen and Bregenz.
