= Hard-Fussach railway station =

Railway station in Vorarlberg, Austria

Hard-Fussach

General information
- Other names: Hard-Fußach
- Location: Bahnhofstraße; 6971 Hard; Austria
- Coordinates: 47°28′46″N 9°41′17″E
- Owner: Austrian Federal Railways (ÖBB)
- Line: St. Margrethen–Lauterach line
- Train operators: ÖBB

Services
Preceding station	Vorarlberg S-Bahn	Following station
Lustenau towards St. Margrethen	S3	Lauterach Unterfeld towards Bregenz
Lustenau towards St. Margrethen	R5	Lauterach towards Feldkirch
Location
- Location within Austria Location within Vorarlberg

Hard-Fussach railway station (German: Bahnhof Hard-Fussach), also known as Hard-Fußach railway station, is a railway station in the town of Hard, located in the district of Bregenz in the Austrian state of Vorarlberg. It is an intermediate stop on the standard gauge St. Margrethen–Lauterach line of Austrian Federal Railways (ÖBB) and serves the towns of Hard and Fußach.

== Services ==
The following services stop at Hard-Fussach:

- Vorarlberg S-Bahn:
  - S3: half-hourly service to St. Margrethen and Bregenz.
  - R5: on weekdays, seven trains per day to St. Margrethen, six to Dornbirn, three to Feldkirch.

== See also ==
- Rail transport in Austria
