= Lauterach Unterfeld railway station =

Railway station in Vorarlberg, Austria

Lauterach Unterfeld

General information
- Location: Forellenweg 2; 6923 Lauterach; Austria
- Coordinates: 47°28′51.4344″N 09°42′56.1816″E
- Owner: Austrian Federal Railways (ÖBB)
- Line: St. Margrethen–Lauterach line
- Train operators: ÖBB

Services
Preceding station	Vorarlberg S-Bahn	Following station
Hard-Fussach towards St. Margrethen	S3	Bregenz Riedenburg towards Bregenz
Location
- Location within Austria Location within Vorarlberg

Lauterach Unterfeld railway station (German: Lauterach Unterfeld) is a railway station in the Unterfeld part of the town of Lauterach, located in the district of Bregenz in the Austrian state of Vorarlberg. It is located on the standard gauge St. Margrethen–Lauterach line of Austrian Federal Railways (ÖBB). The station opened in June 2022.

== Services ==
As of the December 2023 timetable change, the following services stop at Lauterach Unterfeld:

- Vorarlberg S-Bahn S3: half-hourly service to St. Margrethen and Bregenz.

== See also ==
- Rail transport in Austria
