= Lustenau railway station =

Railway station in Vorarlberg, Austria

Lustenau
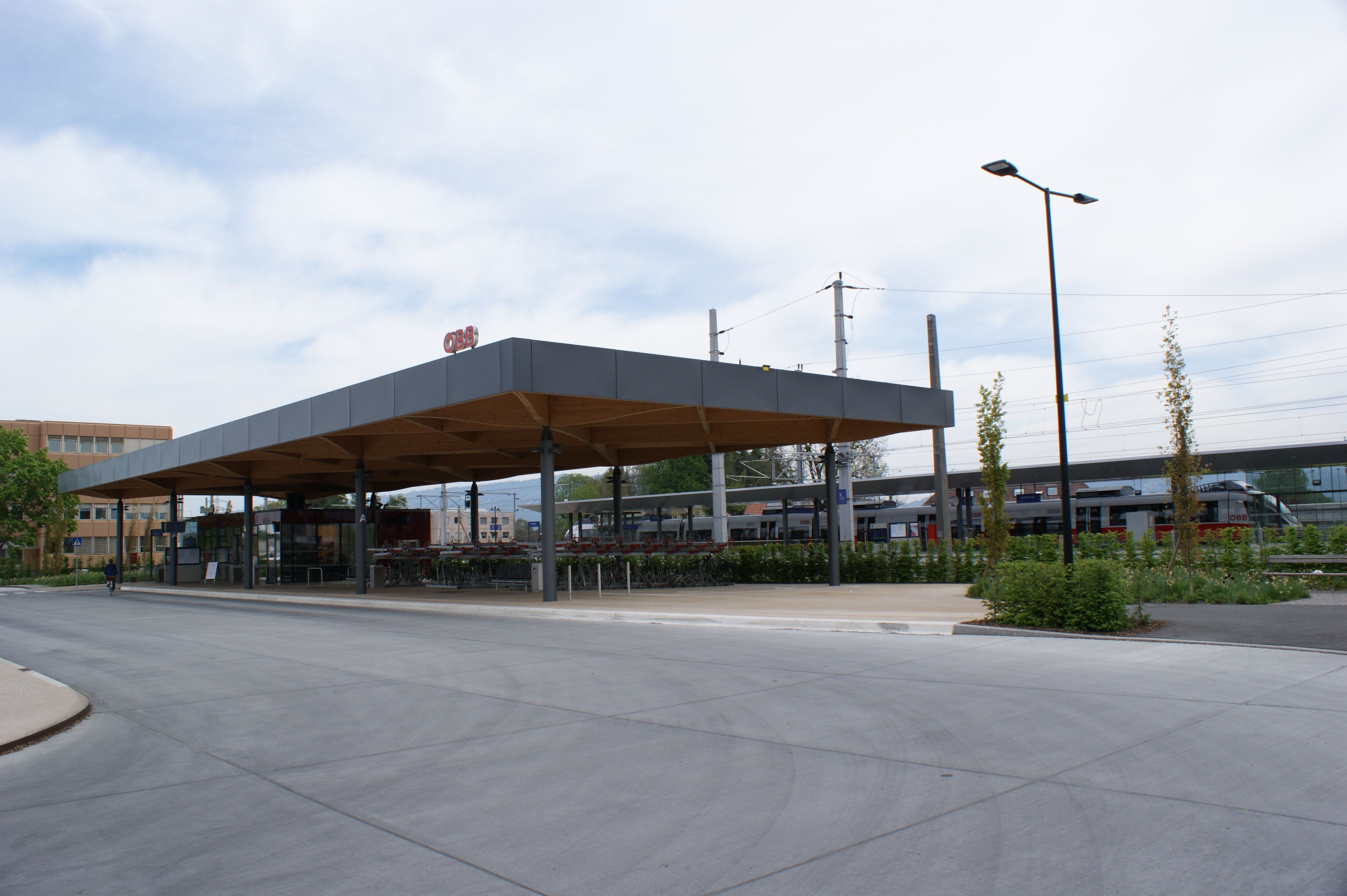
- The station in 2020

General information
- Location: Bahngasse; 6890 Lustenau; Austria
- Coordinates: 47°27′03″N 9°40′01″E
- Owner: Austrian Federal Railways (ÖBB)
- Line: St. Margrethen–Lauterach line
- Train operators: ÖBB

Services
| Preceding station | Vorarlberg S-Bahn | Following station |
|---|---|---|
| St. Margrethen Terminus | S3 | Hard-Fussach towards Bregenz |
| St. Margrethen Terminus | R5 | Hard-Fussach towards Feldkirch |
Location
- Location within Austria Location within Vorarlberg

Lustenau railway station (German: Bahnhof Lustenau) is a railway station in the town of Lustenau, located in the district of Dornbirn in the Austrian state of Vorarlberg. It is an intermediate stop on the standard gauge St. Margrethen–Lauterach line of Austrian Federal Railways (ÖBB). It is situated at the Austria–Switzerland border.

== Services ==
The following services stop at Lustenau:

- Vorarlberg S-Bahn:
  - S3: half-hourly service to St. Margrethen and Bregenz.
  - R5: on weekdays, seven trains per day to St. Margrethen, six to Dornbirn, three to Feldkirch.

== See also ==
- Rail transport in Austria
