= Hard, Austria =

Hard
- Municipality
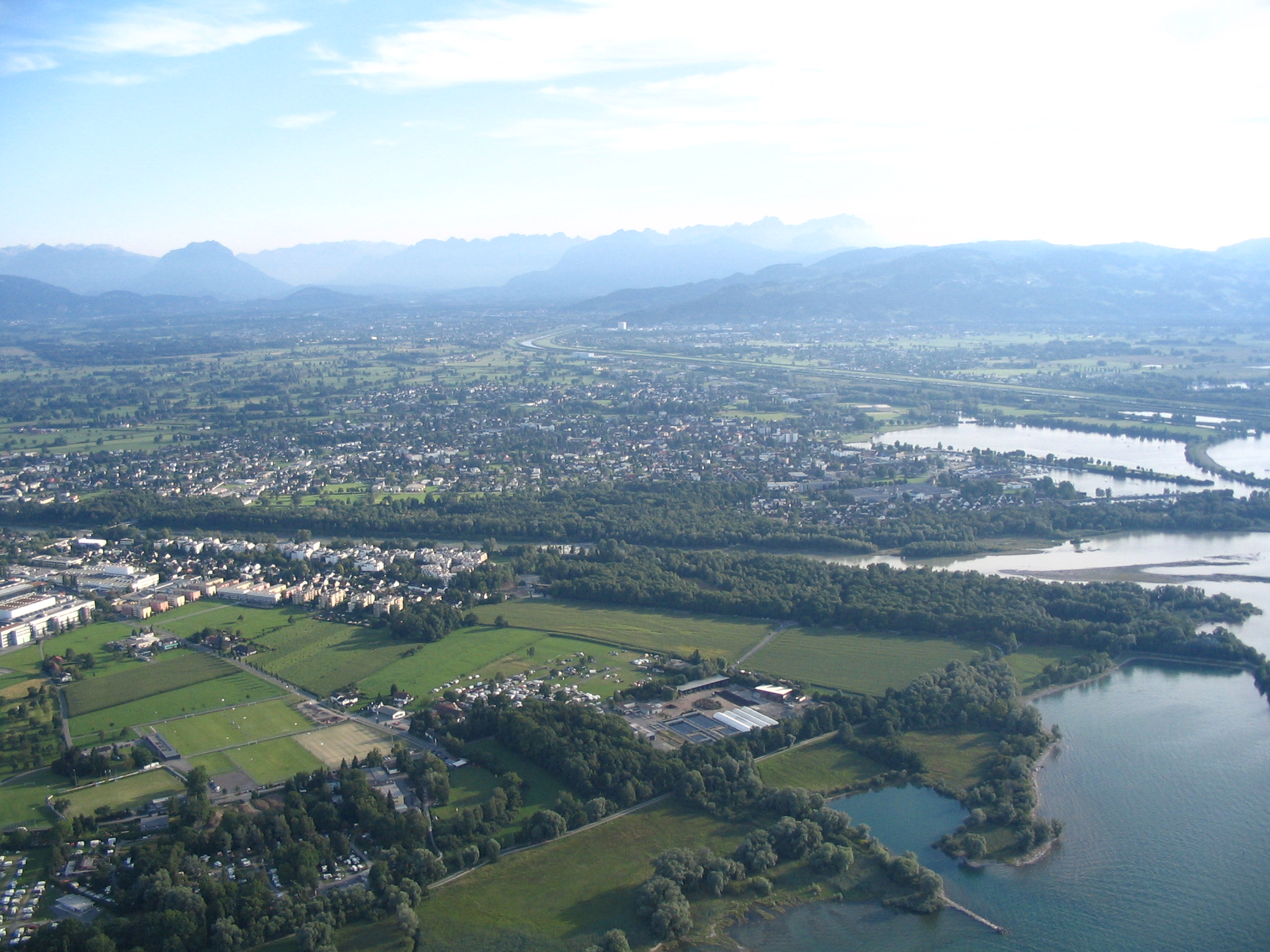

- Coat of arms

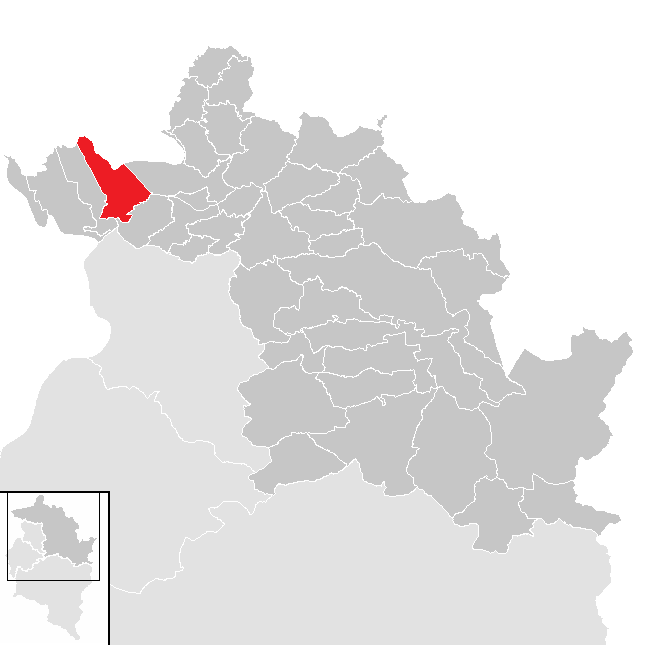
- Location in the district

- Location within Austria
- Coordinates: 47°28′00″N 09°40′00″E
- Country: Austria
- State: Vorarlberg
- District: Bregenz

Government
  - Mayor: Martin Staudinger (SPÖ) (ÖVP)

Area
  - Total: 17.46 km^{2} (6.74 sq mi)
- Elevation: 398–400 m (1,306–1,312 ft)

Population (2018-01-01)
  - Total: 13,495
  - Density: 772.9/km^{2} (2,002/sq mi)
- Time zone: UTC+1 (CET)
  - Summer (DST): UTC+2 (CEST)
- Postal code: 6971
- Area code: 05574
- Vehicle registration: B
- Website: www.hard.at

Hard (Low Alemannic: Haard) is a town in the west of the westernmost Austrian state of Vorarlberg, directly on the southern shores of Lake Constance. Hard's attractions include the Strandbad and the Grünerdamm. Hard is also known for its skatepark.

An honorary consulate of Brazil is located in Hard.

== Population ==
Historical population
Year	Pop.	±%
1869	2,305	—
1880	2,085	−9.5%
1890	2,183	+4.7%
1900	2,914	+33.5%
1910	3,637	+24.8%
1923	3,049	−16.2%
1934	3,387	+11.1%
1939	3,488	+3.0%
1951	4,788	+37.3%
1961	6,671	+39.3%
1971	8,887	+33.2%
1981	10,103	+13.7%
1991	10,747	+6.4%
2001	11,471	+6.7%
2011	12,546	+9.4%

Largest groups of foreign residents
Nationality	Population (2025)
Germany	611
Turkey	584
Croatia	203
Syria	200
Serbia	163
Bosnia and Herzegovina	136
Romania	123
Hungary	58
Italy	53
Ukraine	49
Poland	37
Bulgaria	36
Slovakia	26
Czech Republic	15
Slovenia	13
Iraq	12

== Geography ==
Hard has an area of 17.46 km² (6.75 sq mi). Hard is also located between the two rivers Bregenzer Ach and Rhine, and borders on the provincial capital Bregenz.

== History ==
In the 7th century, Alemanni settled near Mittelweiherburg. Near Lake Constance, around the year 1200, large parts of the woods were cleared to build a village: Hard (Old High German for "forest"). The community of Hard was first mentioned in a charter from Pope Innocent IV to the monastery of Mehrerau in 1249.

In 1794, Samuel Vogel from Alsace opened the first Hard textile factory. In 1802, the "Allmenden" (common grounds) were suspended, resulting in private fields, pastures and forests. In 1997, the textile printing museum in Mittelweiherburg was opened.

=== Harder Schwabenkinder (Swabian children) ===
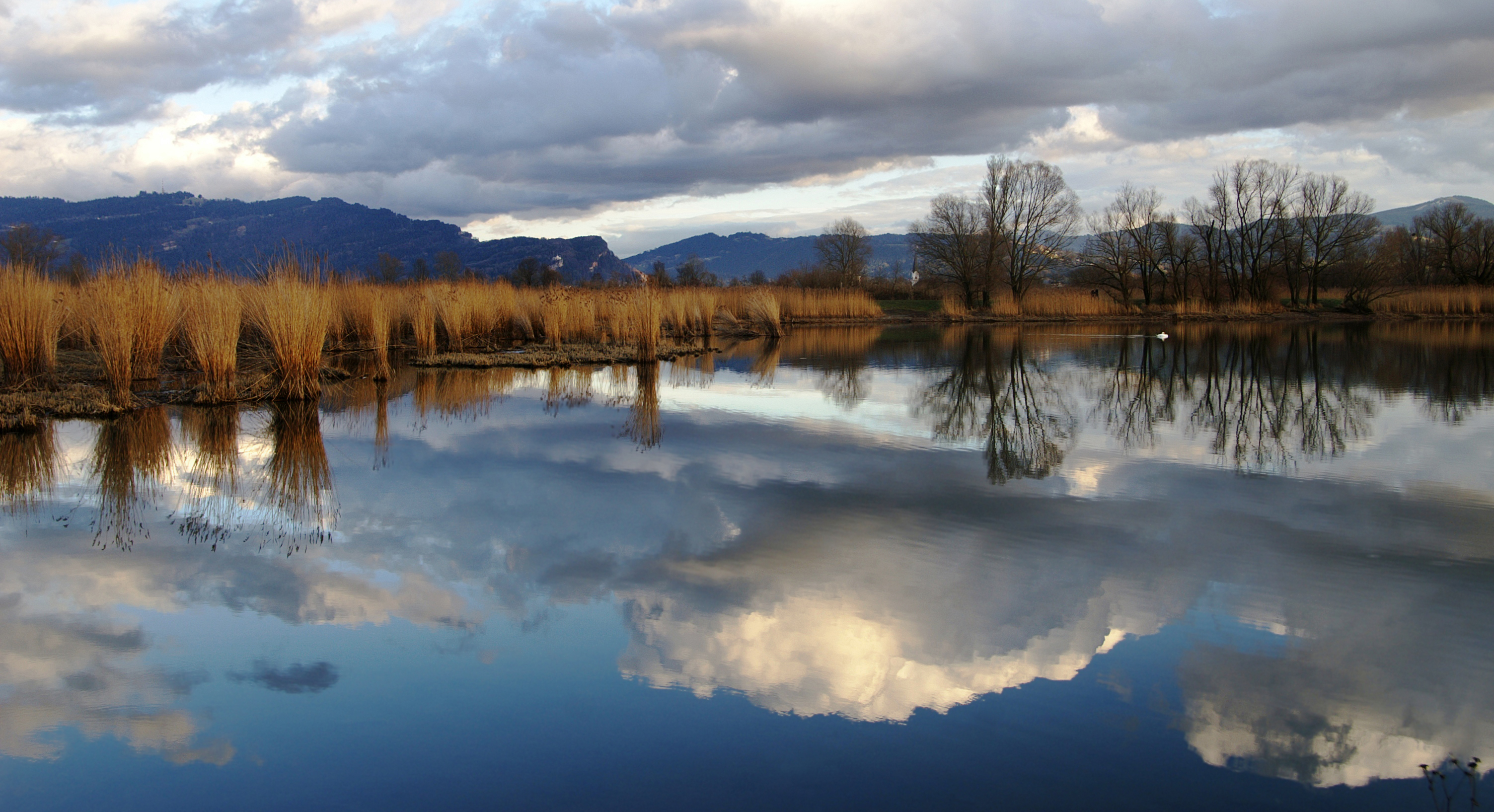
The Schleienlöcher nature reserve in Hard

From the 17th century to the beginning of the 20th century, many poor Vorarlberg farmers sent their children to Swabia, Southern Germany, to do seasonal work there. These children were called "Schwabenkinder", the undertaking itself was referred to as "Schwabengehen".

=== Heraldry ===
The coat of arms of Hard shows two trees and a sailboat. They symbolize important early activities in Hard: logging and fishing.

== Transport ==
Hard-Fussach railway station serves Hard and Fußach. It is located on the St. Margrethen–Lauterach line. The station is served by the S3 and R5 regional train services of Vorarlberg S-Bahn, operated by Austrian Federal Railways (ÖBB).
