= Fußach =

- Municipality
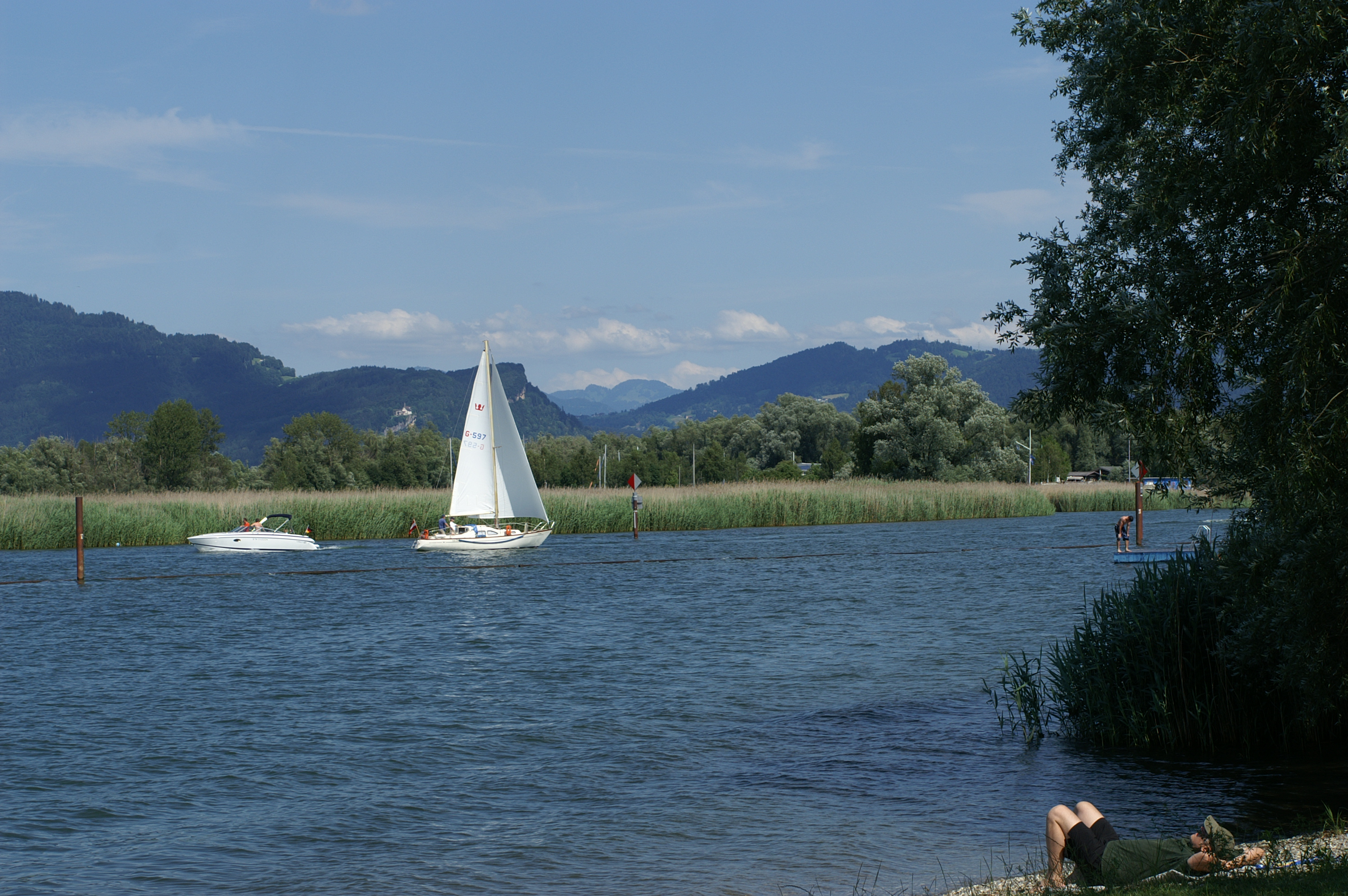

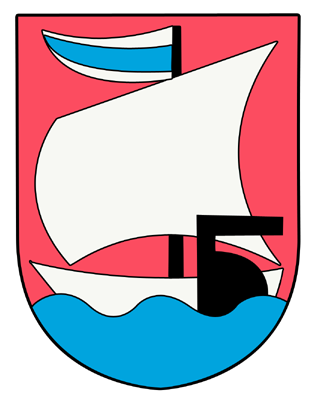
- Coat of arms

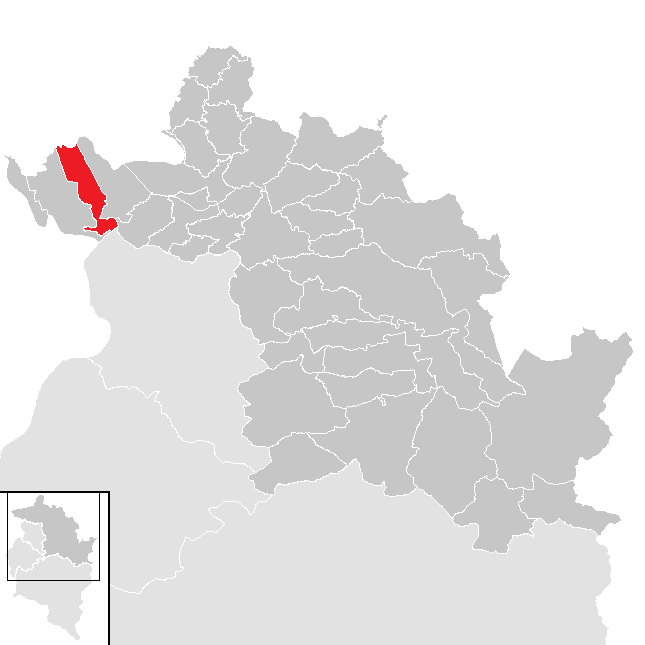
- Location in the district

- Location within Austria
- Coordinates: 47°28′00″N 09°40′00″E
- Country: Austria
- State: Vorarlberg
- District: Bregenz

Government
  - Mayor: Peter Böhler

Area
  - Total: 11.5 km^{2} (4.4 sq mi)
- Elevation: 398 m (1,306 ft)

Population (2018-01-01)
  - Total: 3,871
  - Density: 337/km^{2} (872/sq mi)
- Time zone: UTC+1 (CET)
  - Summer (DST): UTC+2 (CEST)
- Postal code: 6972
- Area code: 05578
- Vehicle registration: B
- Website: www.fussach.at

Fußach is a municipality in the district of Bregenz in the Austrian state of Vorarlberg.

== Population ==
Historical population
Year	Pop.	±%
1869	616	—
1880	585	−5.0%
1890	575	−1.7%
1900	677	+17.7%
1910	644	−4.9%
1923	566	−12.1%
1934	664	+17.3%
1939	673	+1.4%
1951	706	+4.9%
1961	1,013	+43.5%
1971	1,704	+68.2%
1981	2,655	+55.8%
1991	3,073	+15.7%
2001	3,521	+14.6%
2011	3,669	+4.2%

== Transport ==
Hard-Fussach railway station serves Hard and Fußach. It is located on the St. Margrethen–Lauterach line. The station is served by the S3 and R5 regional train services of Vorarlberg S-Bahn, operated by Austrian Federal Railways (ÖBB).
