= Lauterach =

- Municipality
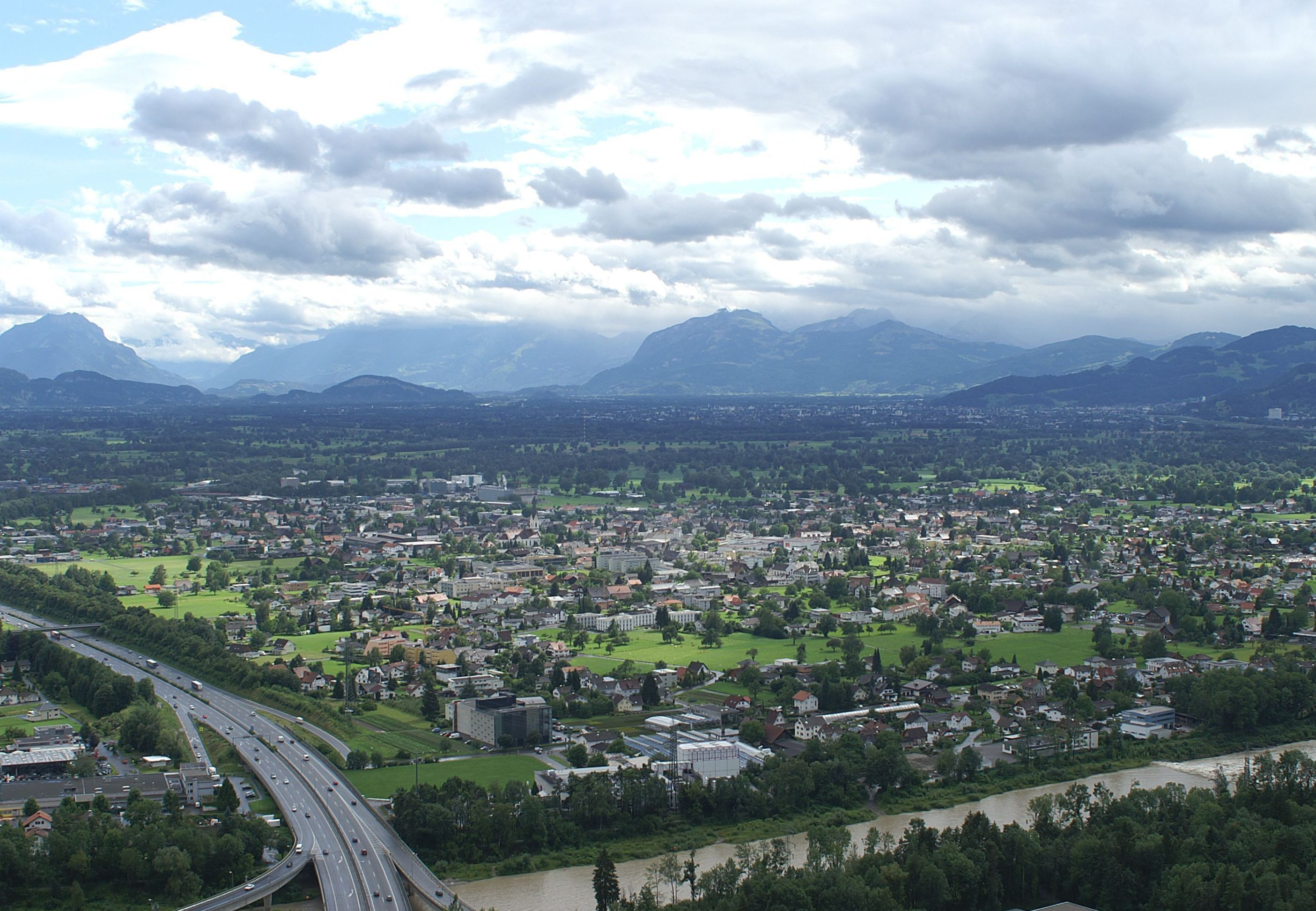

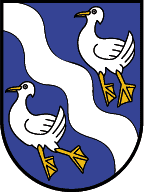
- Coat of arms

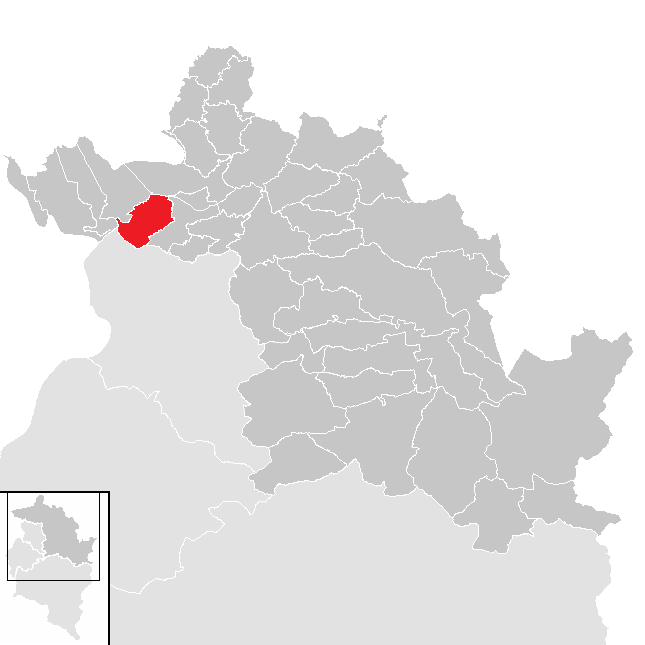
- Location in the district

- Location within Austria
- Coordinates: 47°28′38″N 09°43′53″E
- Country: Austria
- State: Vorarlberg
- District: Bregenz

Government
  - Mayor: Elmar Rhomberg

Area
  - Total: 11.92 km^{2} (4.60 sq mi)
- Elevation: 412 m (1,352 ft)

Population (2018-01-01)
  - Total: 10,267
  - Density: 861.3/km^{2} (2,231/sq mi)
- Time zone: UTC+1 (CET)
  - Summer (DST): UTC+2 (CEST)
- Postal code: 6923
- Area code: 05574
- Vehicle registration: B
- Website: www.lauterach.at

Lauterach (Austrian German pronunciation: [ˈlaʊtərax]) is a municipality in the district of Bregenz in the Austrian state of Vorarlberg. Honorary consulates of Finland, and the United Kingdom are located in Lauterach.

The Lauterach Transmitter is a 116 m tall broadcasting facility.

European route E60 passes through Lauterach.

== Population ==
Historical population
Year	Pop.	±%
1869	1,281	—
1880	1,452	+13.3%
1890	1,603	+10.4%
1900	1,712	+6.8%
1910	1,954	+14.1%
1923	1,996	+2.1%
1934	2,107	+5.6%
1939	2,250	+6.8%
1951	2,919	+29.7%
1961	3,844	+31.7%
1971	5,705	+48.4%
1981	6,440	+12.9%
1991	7,555	+17.3%
2001	8,678	+14.9%
2011	9,457	+9.0%

== Personalities ==
- Bruno Pezzey (1955–1994), 84-time national football player
- Julian Knowle (b. 1974), tennis player
- André Pilz (b. 1972), writer
- Markus Weissenberger (b. 1975), soccer player
- Christian Hirschbühl (b. 1990), ski racer

== Transport ==
There are two railway stations within the municipality. Lauterach railway station is an intermediate stop on the Vorarlberg railway line (Vorarlbergbahn) traversing Vorarlberg in a north-south direction. This railway station is called at by the S1 and R5 regional train services of Vorarlberg S-Bahn. Since June 2022, there is another station, Lauterach Unterfeld, which is situated on the St. Margrethen–Lauterach line and served by the S3 of Vorarlberg S-Bahn. All services are operated by Austrian Federal Railways (ÖBB).
