= Lauterach Transmitter =

Broadcasting facility, Lauterach, Austria

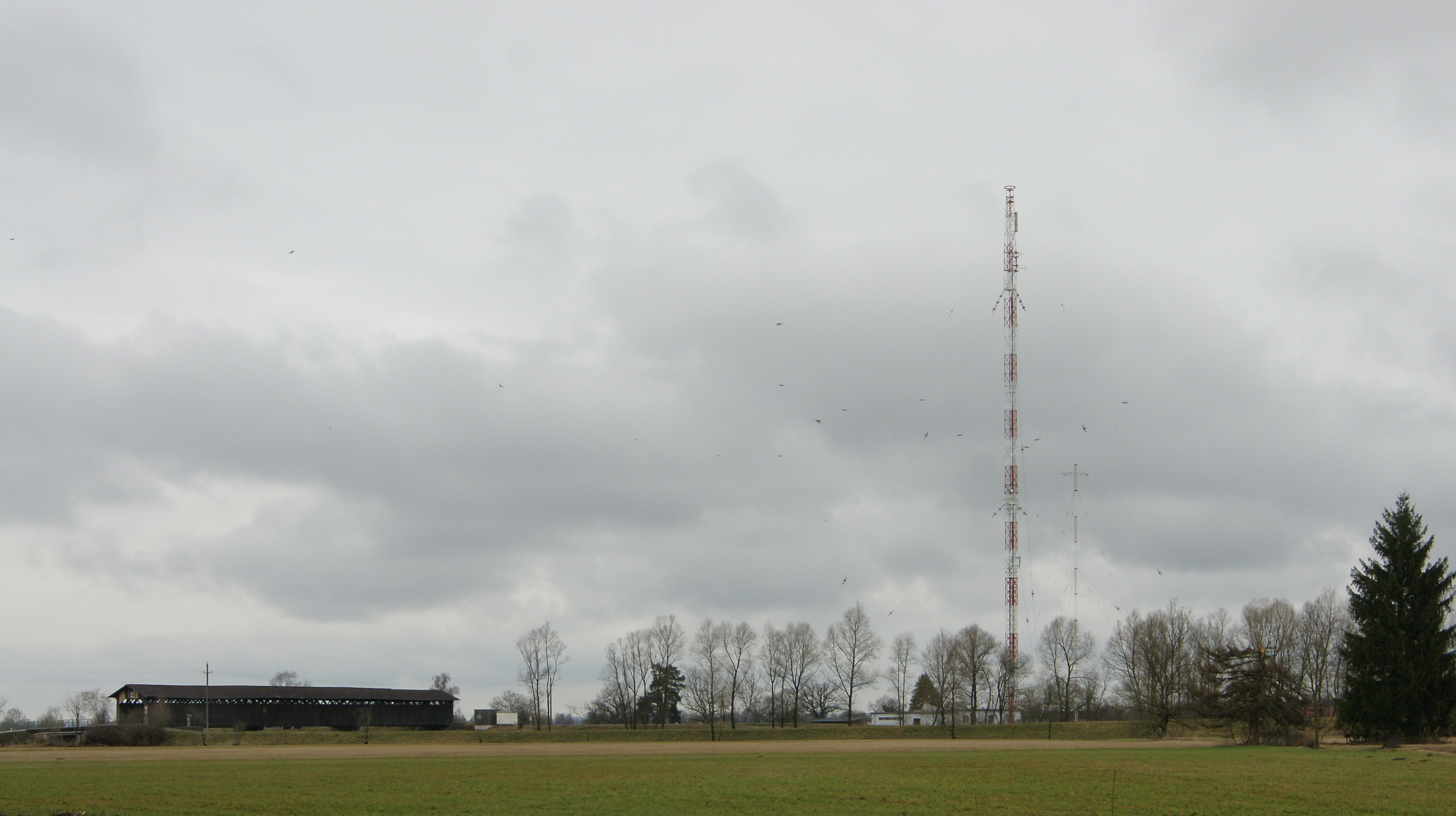
The Lauterach station, Lauterach, Austria.

Lauterach Transmitter is a broadcasting facility in Lauterach, Austria, located at 47°26′55″N 9°42′10″E . It is used for FM and TV broadcasting, and until 1995 also for medium-wave broadcasting.It was inaugurated in 1934 and uses as antenna mast a 116-metre-tall (381 ft) guyed mast, which is insulated against ground.
