= Lindau-Reutin station =

Railway station in Bavaria

Lindau-Reutin
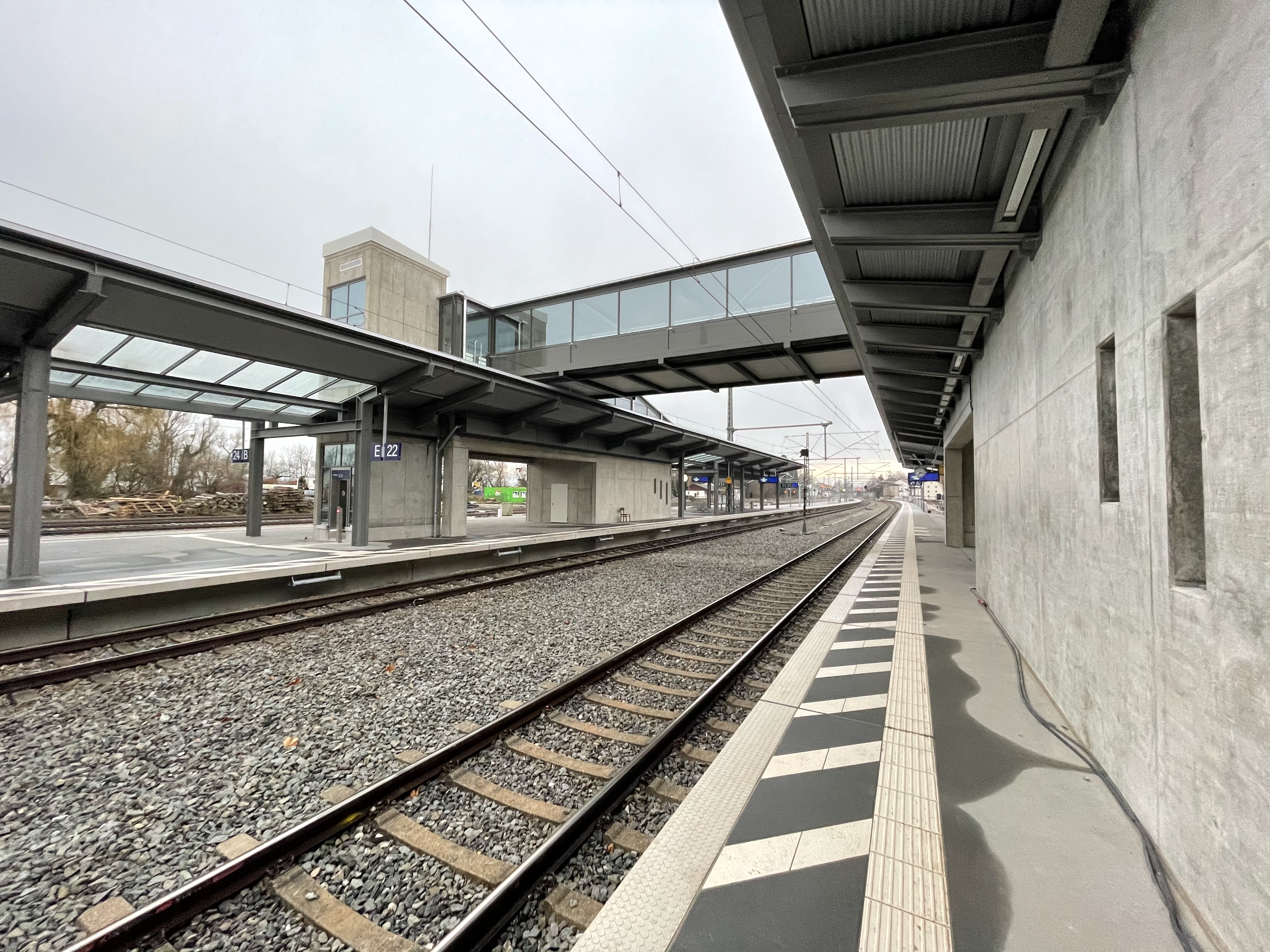
- View from the house platform (track 21) onto the overpass to the central platform (tracks 22-24)

General information
- Location: Lindau, Bavaria; Germany
- Coordinates: 47°33′08″N 9°42′12″E
- Owner: Deutsche Bahn
- Operator: DB Station&Service
- Lines: Vorarlberg Railway; Holdereggenkurve
- Platforms: 2
- Connections: Stadtbus Lindau: 1, 3, 5; Regionalbus: 16, 17, 20, 21, 105.1, 129, 161, 192, 211

Construction
- Accessible: Yes

Other information
- Website: www.bahnhof.de

History
- Opened: December 2020
Services
Preceding station	DB Fernverkehr	Following station
Friedrichshafen Stadt towards Dortmund Hbf	ICE 62 Bodensee	Bregenz towards Innsbruck Hbf
Memmingen towards München Hbf	ECE 88 EuroCity towards Austria, EuroCityExpress towards Munich	Bregenz towards Zürich HB
Preceding station		Following station
Lindau-Insel Terminus	WESTbahn	Bregenz toward Wien Westbahnhof
Preceding station	DB Regio Bayern	Following station
Hergatz towards Nürnberg Hbf	RE 7	Reverses direction
Lindau-Insel Terminus	RE 7	Reverses direction
Hergatz towards München Hbf	RE 70	Reverses direction
Lindau-Insel Terminus	RE 70	Reverses direction
Preceding station	DB Regio Baden-Württemberg	Following station
Wasserburg (Bodensee) towards Ulm Hbf	RE 3	Terminus
Lindau-Aeschach towards Stuttgart Hbf	RE 5 Limited service	Terminus
Preceding station		Following station
Lindau-Insel towards Memmingen	RB 92	Terminus
Lindau-Insel towards München Hbf	RE 96	Terminus
Preceding station	ÖBB	Following station
Lindau-Insel Terminus	REX 1	Lochau-Hörbranz towards Bludenz
Preceding station	Vorarlberg S-Bahn	Following station
Lindau-Insel Terminus	S1	Lochau-Hörbranz towards Bludenz
Preceding station	St. Gallen S-Bahn	Following station
Lindau-Insel Terminus	S7	Bregenz towards Weinfelden
Location
- Location within Bavaria Location within Germany Location within Europe

Lindau-Reutin station is a junction station in the town of Lindau (Lake Constance), where the Aeschach curve branches off from the Vorarlberg Railway (Lindau-Bregenz–Bludenz). It is also a border station with Austria. In the course of the reconstruction of the Lindau rail hub, which began in 2016, the rail facilities, which were last used only as a goods station, were expanded into Lindau's new long-distance train station, which went into operation in 2020. In contrast to the terminus station Lindau-Insel (until 2020: Lindau Hbf), which opened in 1854, the station in the most populous district Reutin is a through station on the mainland. A station for local passenger services opened at Lindau-Reutin as Lindau-Lokalbahnhof in 1876 and was known as Lindau-Ost from 1911 but the last passenger services to it ended in 1980. The station building is located on Bregenzer Straße, on a level with Berliner Platz.

== Operations ==
Since the timetable change on 13 December 2020, six connections are offered daily in the direction of Munich and Zurich as EuroCity-Express (ECE) and Eurocity (EC), with a change of train class in Reutin. Thanks to the expansion of tilting technology, the electrification of the route between Geltendorf and Lindau and the elimination of the previous traction and direction change in Lindau, they are about 20 minutes faster between the two cities than before.

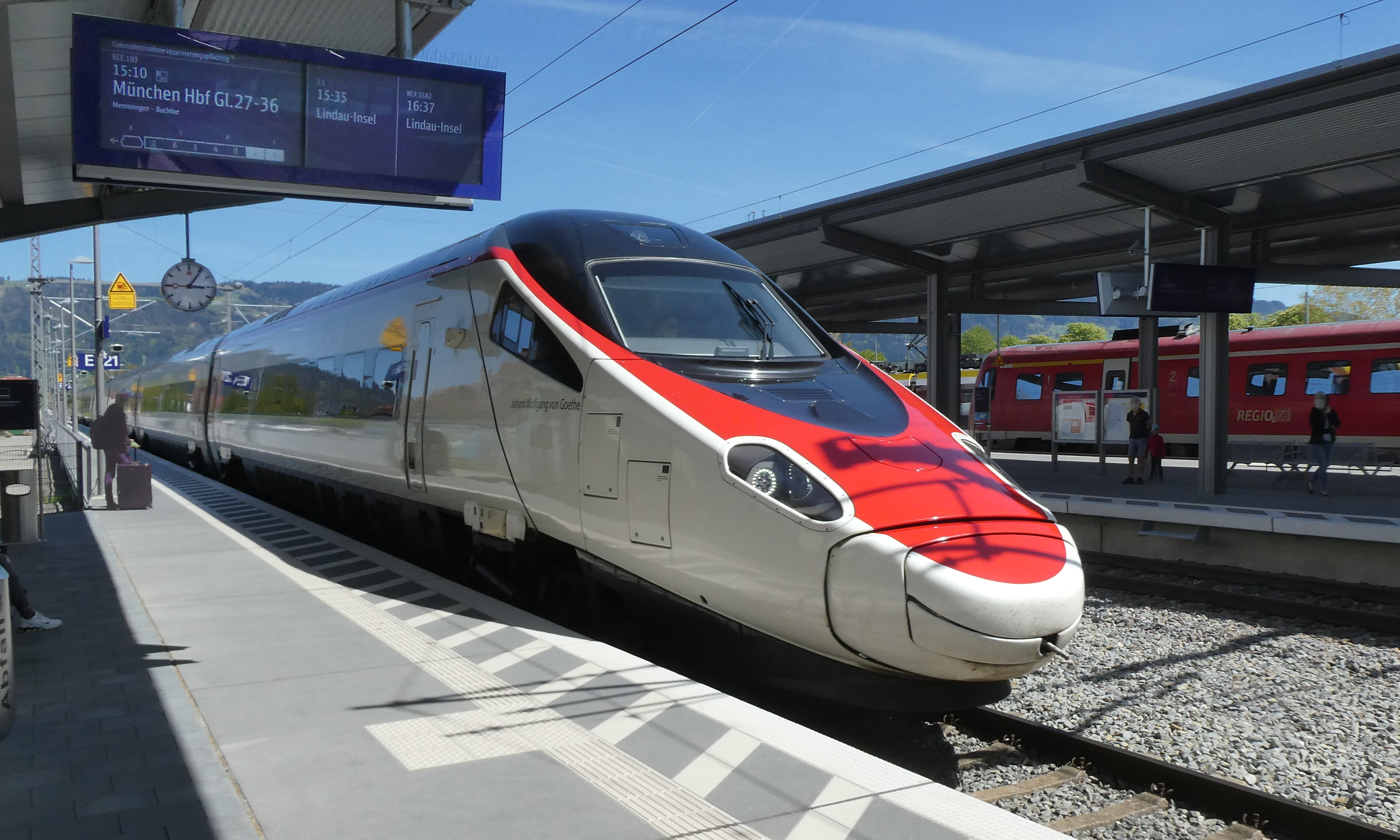
ECE at Lindau-Reutin

From the beginning of July to mid-September 2021, a pair of trains will run on Saturdays on the Bregenz–Lindau-Reutlin–Berlin route as ICE 1208/1209.

In addition, Lindau-Reutin is served by the S1 of the Vorarlberg S-Bahn as well as ÖBB regional trains, which passed the station without stopping until 2020. The remaining regional services continued to stop only at Lindau-Insel station, with the exception of the RE 7, which was extended to Lindau-Reutin in 2020. The RE 5, RE 7 and RE 70 were rerouted to Lindau-Reutin and a new service, the RE 96, from Munich to Lindau-Reutin via Memmingen and Lindau-Insel was introduced in 2021.

=== Long distance services ===
In the 2026 timetable, the following long distance services stop at the station:

Service	Route	Frequency	Operator	Notes
ICE 62	Dortmund – Bochum – Essen – Duisburg – Düsseldorf – Köln Messe/Deutz – Frankfurt Airport – Mannheim – Heidelberg – Stuttgart – Ulm – Friedrichshafen Stadt – Lindau-Reutin – Bregenz – St. Anton – Innsbruck	1 train pair	DB Fernverkehr	
ECE 88	München Hbf – Buchloe – Memmingen – Lindau-Reutin – Bregenz – St. Margrethen – St. Gallen – Winterthur – Zürich Flughafen – Zürich HB	120 min	DB Fernverkehr	towards Austria/Switzerland as EuroCity, towards Munich as EuroCityExpress
green	Lindau-Insel – Lindau-Reutin – Bregenz – Innsbruck – Salzburg – Linz – Wien Westbahnhof	1 train pair	WESTbahn	

=== Regional services ===
In the 2026 timetable, the following regional services of the Vorarlberg S-Bahn, St. Gallen S-Bahn and Bodensee S-Bahn stop at the station:

Service	Route	Frequency	Operator
RE 3	Lindau-Reutin – Friedrichshafen Stadt – Aulendorf – Ulm	60 min	DB Regio Baden-Württemberg
RE 5	Lindau-Reutin – Friedrichshafen Stadt – Aulendorf – Ulm – Stuttgart	One train	DB Regio Baden-Württemberg
RE 7	Lindau-Insel – Lindau-Reutin – Hergatz – Immenstadt – Kempten – Buchloe – Augsburg (– Nürnberg Hbf)	120 min	DB Regio Bayern
RE 70	Lindau-Insel – Lindau-Reutin – Hergatz – Immenstadt – Kempten – Buchloe – München Hbf	120 min	DB Regio Bayern
RB 92	Lindau-Reutin – Lindau-Insel – Hergatz – Wangen – Kißlegg – Memmingen	120 min	Go-Ahead Bayern
RE 96	Lindau-Reutin – Lindau-Insel – Kißlegg – Memmingen – Buchloe – Munich	120 min	Go-Ahead Bayern
REX 1	Lindau-Insel – Lindau-Reutin – Bregenz – Dornbirn – Feldkirch – Bludenz (– Vandans – Schruns)	60 min	Montafoner Bahn / ÖBB
S1	Lindau-Insel – Lindau-Reutin – Bregenz – Dornbirn – Feldkirch – Bludenz	60 min	ÖBB
S7 / REX 7	Lindau-Insel – Lindau-Reutin – Bregenz – St. Margrethen – Rorschach – Romanshorn (– Weinfelden)	120 min; weekends only	ÖBB / THURBO

== See also ==
- Rail transport in Germany
