= St. Margrethen–Lauterach line =

Railway line in Austria and Switzerland

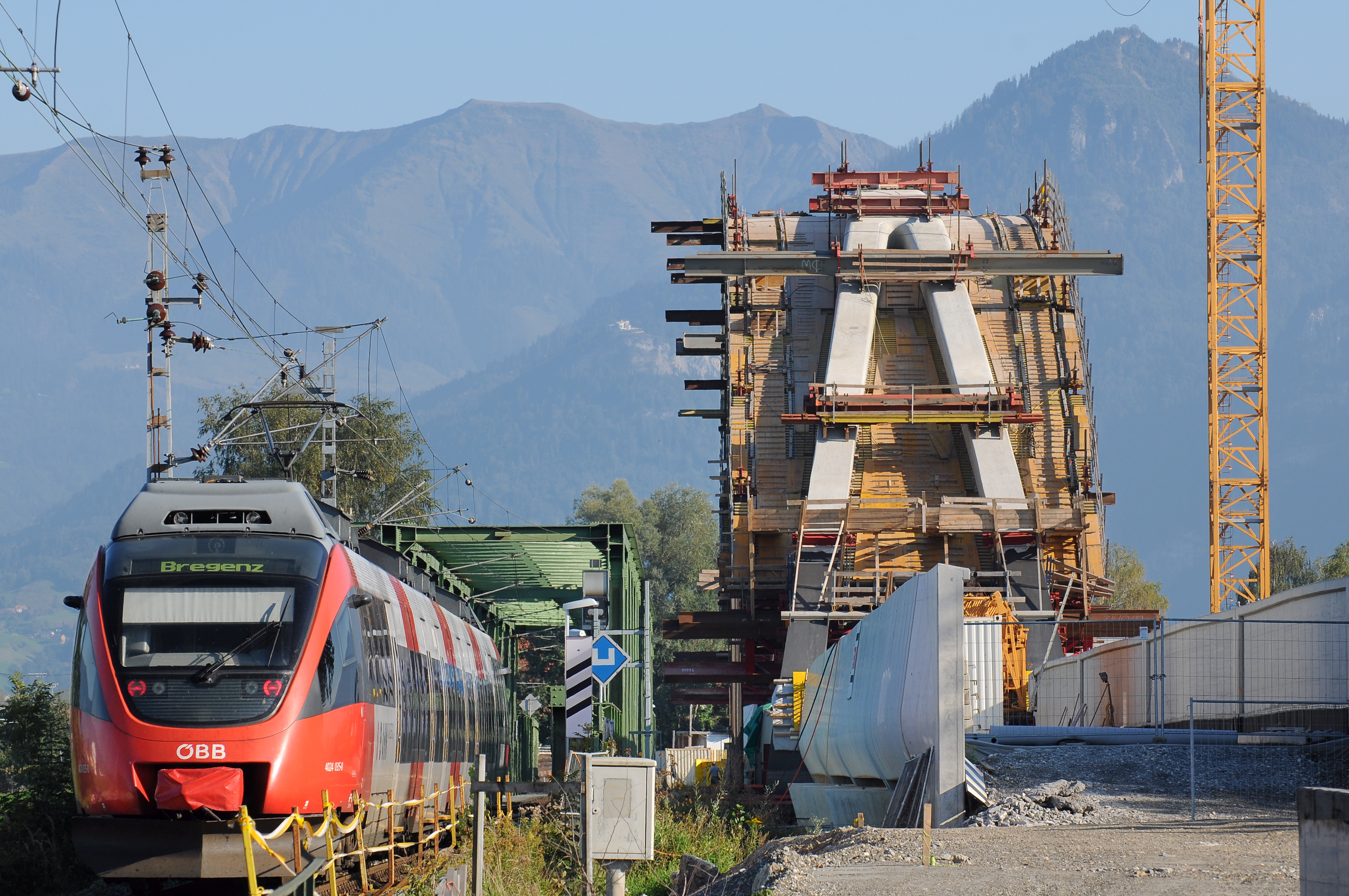
- A Bregenz-bound train crosses the old bridge over the Rhine in 2012 as construction proceeds on the new bridge that would open in 2013

Overview
- Locale: Vorarlberg, Austria; St. Gallen, Switzerland

Technical
- Track gauge: 1,435 mm (4 ft 8 1/2 in) standard gauge

The St. Margrethen–Lauterach line (German: Bahnstrecke St. Margrethen–Lauterach) is a 9.580-kilometre (5.953 mi) long, part single part double tracked, electrified railway line in the Alpine Rhine Valley, near Lake Constance. The route is owned and operated by Austrian Federal Railways (ÖBB) and is mainly used by the border station in St. Margrethen.

The line connects the Chur–Rorschach line at the St. Margrethen border station in the Swiss canton of St. Gallen with the Lauterach Nord junction in Lauterach in the Austrian state of Vorarlberg, where it joins the Vorarlberg line.

== History ==
The Vorarlberg Railway (Aktiengesellschaft k. k. priv. Vorarlberger Bahn) opened the cross-border line between Austria-Hungary and Switzerland on 23 November 1872. The first through express train between Zürich and Munich ran just under a year later, on 1 November 1873. The line, as with most of the Austrian railway network, was nationalized prior to World War I. The line was electrified on 2 January 1949.

Between 2010 and 2013, the Alpine Rhine bridge was replaced by a new one and the adjacent Lustenau Markt station was suspended. Between 2016 and 2021, Lustenau station was modernized. In 2021, the section between Lustenau and Lauterach was renewed, including the reconstruction of Hard-Fussach station and upgrade of the section between this station and Lauterach West to two tracks. The new station Lauterach Unterfeld (replacing the former Lauterach West station) was introduced. Additional measures taken included improved noise protection for residents and flood protection.

== Route ==
The line diverges from the Chur–Rorschach line at St. Margrethen and runs eastward over the single-tracked bridge across Alpine Rhine (which forms the Austria–Switzerland border) and across the tracks of the International Rhine Regulation Railway to Lustenau. East of the bridge, the line now turns north. Between Lustenau station and Hard-Fussach station, it follows the artificial Rhine canal in northward direction, before turning towards east again as a double tracked railway. East of Lauterach Unterfeld station, it connects to the Vorarlberg railway line in both northward and southward direction via two connectors.

== Services ==
As of the December 2023 timetable change, local passenger service with intermediate calls en route is provided by the S3, which operates every half-hour between St. Margrethen and Bregenz, and R5 of Vorarlberg S-Bahn. Additionally some trains of the S7 service of St. Gallen S-Bahn/Bodensee S-Bahn and long-distance EuroCity trains (Zürich–Munich) operate over the route but make no intermediate stops:

- EuroCity (EC): Zürich HB – Winterthur – St. Gallen – Bregenz – Lindau-Reutin – Memmingen – Buchloe – München Hbf
- Vorarlberg S-Bahn:
  - S3: St. Margrethen – Lustenau – Bregenz
  - R5: (St. Margrethen –) Lustenau – Lauterach – Dornbirn – Feldkirch
- St. Gallen S-Bahn/Bodensee S-Bahn: S7: (Weinfelden – Amriswil –) Romanshorn – Arbon – Rorschach (– St. Margrethen –Bregenz – Lindau-Reutin)
