= Lindau-Insel station =

Railway halt in Lindau, Germany

Lindau-Insel
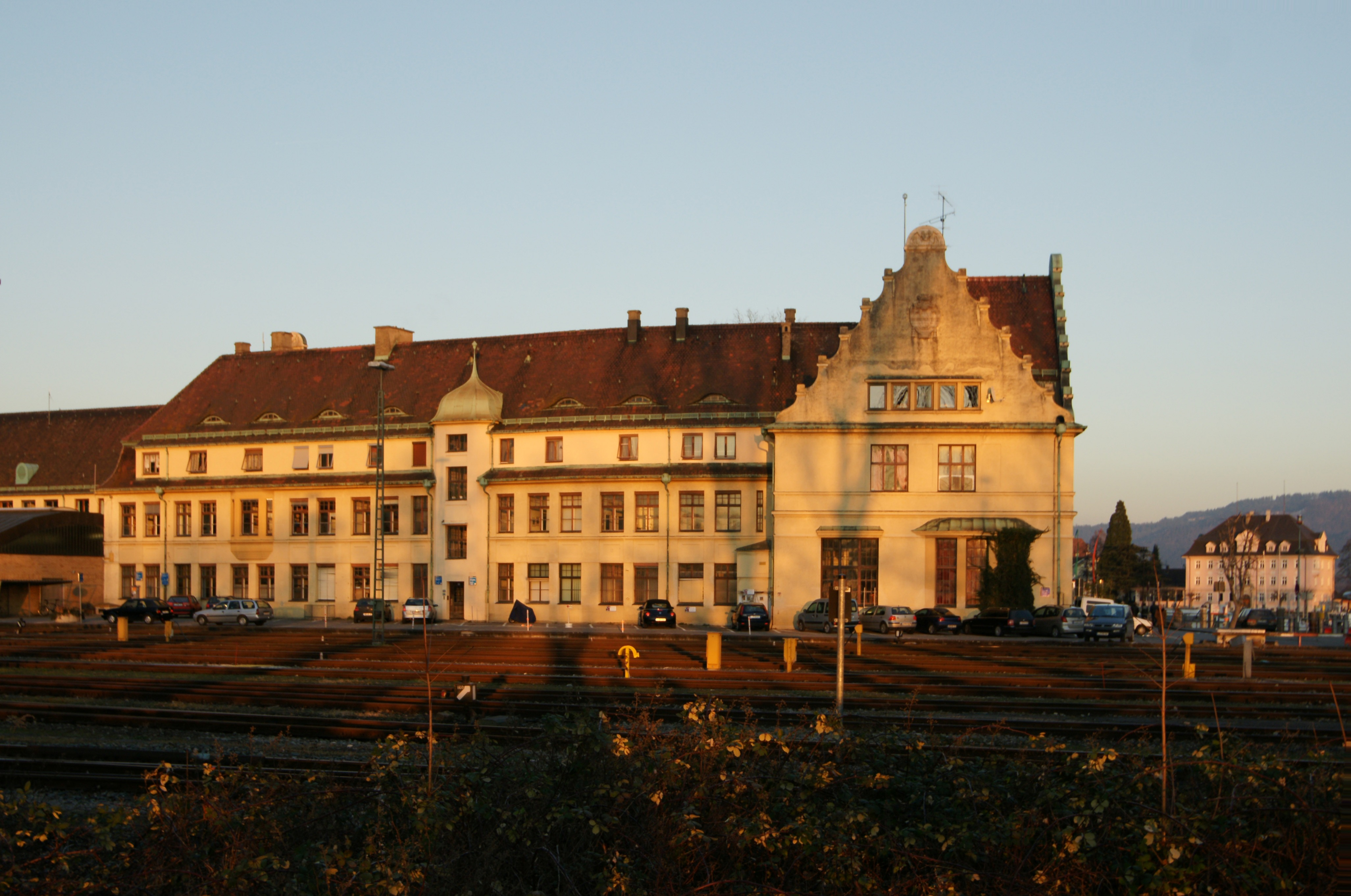

General information
- Location: Am Bahnhof 1, Lindau, Bavaria; Germany
- Coordinates: 47°32′41″N 9°40′49″E
- Owner: Deutsche Bahn
- Operator: DB Netz; DB Station&Service
- Lines: Buchloe–Lindau (152.9 km) (KBS 970); Radolfzell–Lindau (152.9 km) (KBS 731); Lindau–Bludenz (−0.1 km) (KBS 401)
- Platforms: 8
- Connections: Stadtbus Lindau: 2, 5; Regionalbus: 17, 192, 200; Ferry to Konstanz, Bregenz, Rorschach, Friedrichshafen

Construction
- Accessible: Yes
- Architectural style: Art Nouveau

Other information
- Station code: 3727
- DS100 code: MLI
- IBNR: 8000230
- Category: 3
- Fare zone: bodo: 400
- Website: stationsdatenbank.de; www.bahnhof.de

History
- Opened: 1853

Services
Preceding station		Following station
Terminus	WESTbahn	Lindau-Reutin toward Wien Westbahnhof
Preceding station	DB Regio Bayern	Following station
Terminus	RE 7	Lindau-Reutin towards Nürnberg Hbf
Terminus	RE 70	Lindau-Reutin towards München Hbf
Terminus	RE 75	Hergatz towards Ulm Hbf
Preceding station	DB Regio Baden-Württemberg	Following station
Terminus	RB 93	Lindau-Aeschach towards Friedrichshafen Stadt
Preceding station		Following station
Reverses direction	RE 96	Hergatz towards München Hbf
Reverses direction	RE 96	Lindau-Reutin Terminus
Terminus	RB 92	Hergatz towards Memmingen
Preceding station	ÖBB	Following station
Terminus	REX 1	Lindau-Reutin towards Bludenz
Preceding station	Vorarlberg S-Bahn	Following station
Terminus	S1	Lindau-Reutin towards Bludenz
Preceding station	St. Gallen S-Bahn	Following station
Terminus	S7	Lindau-Reutin towards Weinfelden
Location
- Location within Bavaria Location within Germany Location within Europe

Lindau-Insel station (German: Bahnhof Lindau-Insel, lit. 'Lindau Island'), named Lindau Stadt (lit. 'Lindau City') until 15 May 1936 and then Lindau Hauptbahnhof (lit. 'Lindau Main Station') until 12 December 2020, is the largest railway station in the city of Lindau in the German state of Bavaria. It is a terminal station and located on the island of Lindau, Lake Constance (Bodensee).

It was the city's most important station until passenger service resumed at Lindau-Reutin station on 13 December 2020. Another station, Lindau-Aeschach, is also in the urban area. Formerly there were several other stations in Lindau: Lindau-Siebertsdorf (called Lindau-Zech until 15 May 1936), Lindau Langenweg, Lindau Strandbad, Schoenau, Oberreitnau and Rehlings.

== Location ==
Lindau-Insel is a railway terminus and lies on the island of Lindau in the immediate vicinity of Lindau harbour. The current station building, which is protected as a monument, was built between 1913 and 1921 in the Art Nouveau style.

The station is about 500 metres long and is connected by a four-track line running over an embankment to the mainland. The embankment and the parallel Seebrücke road bridge, which is about 500 metres to the east, form the perimeter of the so-called Kleinen See (small lake), which lies between the suburb of Aeschach and the island. On the west side of the station there is a small marshalling yard and the former depot. Meanwhile, some workshops in the rear are still used for vehicle maintenance.

The railway lines separate the districts of Hauptinsel (main island) from the Hinteren Insel (rear island). However, a pedestrian bridge and the Thiersch road bridge run above the tracks.

== History ==
Lindau-Insel is the terminus of the Buchloe–Lindau railway, running from Buchloe via Kempten. Its southeastern section from Oberstaufen to Lindau was completed on 1 September 1853. From 1869 to 1939 there was a ferry port for the carriage of freight wagons to Romanshorn and from 1873 to 1899 to Konstanz. In 1899, the Friedrichshafen–Lindau railway was opened from Radolfzell via Friedrichshafen. The Vorarlberg Railway runs from Lindau via Bregenz, Dornbirn and Feldkirch to Bludenz and is operated by the Austrian Federal Railways (ÖBB). As a result, Lindau is also a border station. Formerly the ÖBB had its own ticket office in Lindau station; this was replaced by ticket machines, which still exist.

The route to Bludenz was electrified on 14 December 1954. Electrification of a section of Buchloe–Lindau railway was completed in December 2021, completing an electrified route to Munich via Memmingen. Electrification of the route to Friedrichshafen was completed at the same time. All tracks are electrified.

== Operations ==
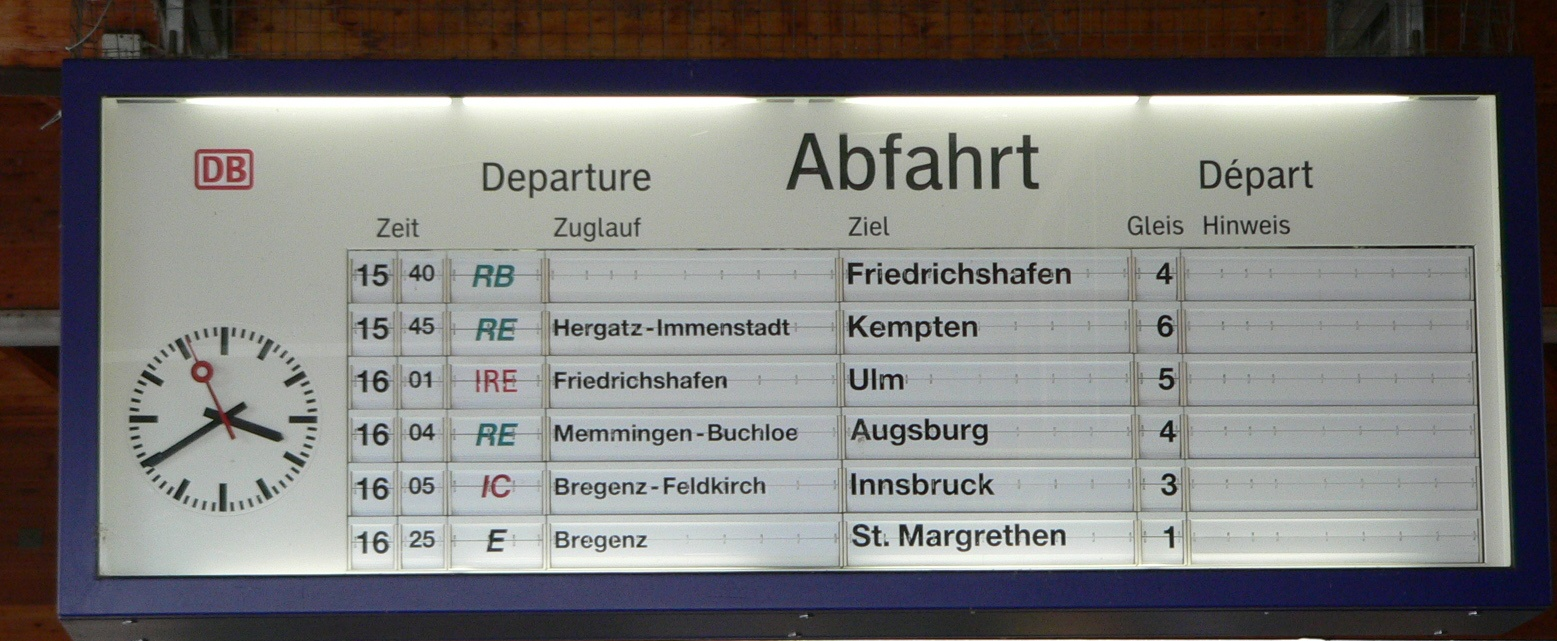
The departure board in 2005

=== Long-distance passenger services ===
From December 2010 to December 2013, a Railjet was operated daily to Lindau. The counter train ran as a regional express to Bregenz with a stop in Lochau-Hörbranz and from Bregenz as a Railjet to Vienna, as the Railjet replaced a regular regional express or an S-Bahn on the Lindau-Bregenz route. In earlier years, ÖBB also operated express trains (Ex) to Lindau, including direct connections to the Austrian capital Vienna. Today, the Austrian long-distance trains mostly end or begin in neighboring Bregenz.

In long-distance passenger rail services, Eurocity Line 88 offered regular connections from Munich via Lindau to Zurich until 12 December 2020. On the Eurocity trains, the locomotive changeover between German diesel and Swiss electric traction was carried out at Lindau-Insel station. The Munich - Lindau connection via Memmingen was electrified to enable continuous operation under catenary. Since 13 December 2020, the Munich-Zurich trains, now called EuroCity-Express, have served Lindau-Reutin station instead.

Since 15 December 2024, WESTbahn offers services towards Wien Westbahnhof.

Service	Route	Frequency	Operator
green	Lindau-Insel – Lindau-Reutin – Bregenz – Innsbruck – Salzburg – Linz – Wien Westbahnhof	2 train pairs	WESTbahn

=== Regional services ===
Several regional train services operate for the Bodensee S-Bahn.

Service	Route	Frequency	Operator
RE 7	Lindau-Insel – Hergatz – Kempten (Allgäu) – Kaufbeuren – Buchloe – Augsburg (– Nuremberg)	120 min	DB Regio Bayern
RE 70	Lindau-Insel – Lindau-Reutin – Hergatz – Immenstadt – Kempten – Buchloe – München Hbf	120 min	DB Regio Bayern
RE 72	Lindau-Insel – Hergatz – Memmingen – Mindelheim – Buchloe – Kaufering – München-Pasing –München Hbf	one train Sat-Sun	Arverio Bayern
RE 75	Lindau-Insel – Hergatz– Kempten (Allgäu) – Memmingen – Senden – Ulm Hbf	one train Mon-Fri	DB Regio Bayern
RE 96	Lindau-Reutin – Lindau-Insel – Kißlegg – Memmingen – Buchloe – München Hbf	120 min	Arverio Bayern
REX 1	Lindau-Insel – Lindau-Reutin – Bregenz – Dornbirn – Feldkirch – Bludenz (– Vandans – Schruns)	60 min	ÖBB
RB 92	Lindau-Insel – Hergatz – Wangen – Kißlegg – Memmingen	120 min	Go-Ahead Bavaria
RB 93	Lindau-Insel – Wasserburg (Bodensee) – Friedrichshafen Stadt (– Friedrichshafen Hafen)	60 min	DB Regio Baden-Württemberg
S1	Lindau-Insel – Lindau-Reutin – Bregenz – Dornbirn – Feldkirch – Bludenz	120 min	ÖBB
S7 / REX 7	Lindau-Insel – Lindau-Reutin – Bregenz – St. Margrethen – Rorschach – Romanshorn (– Weinfelden)	120 min; weekends only	ÖBB / THURBO

=== City buses ===
Bus routes 1 and 2 of Stadtbus Lindau operate from the station forecourt to all part of the city of Lindau.

== Gallery ==
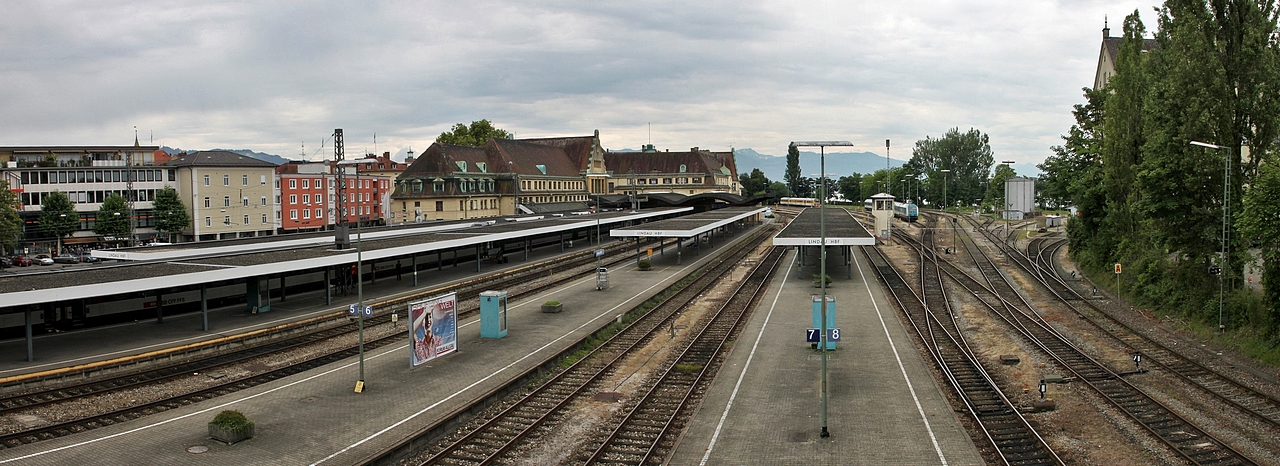
View of the tracks

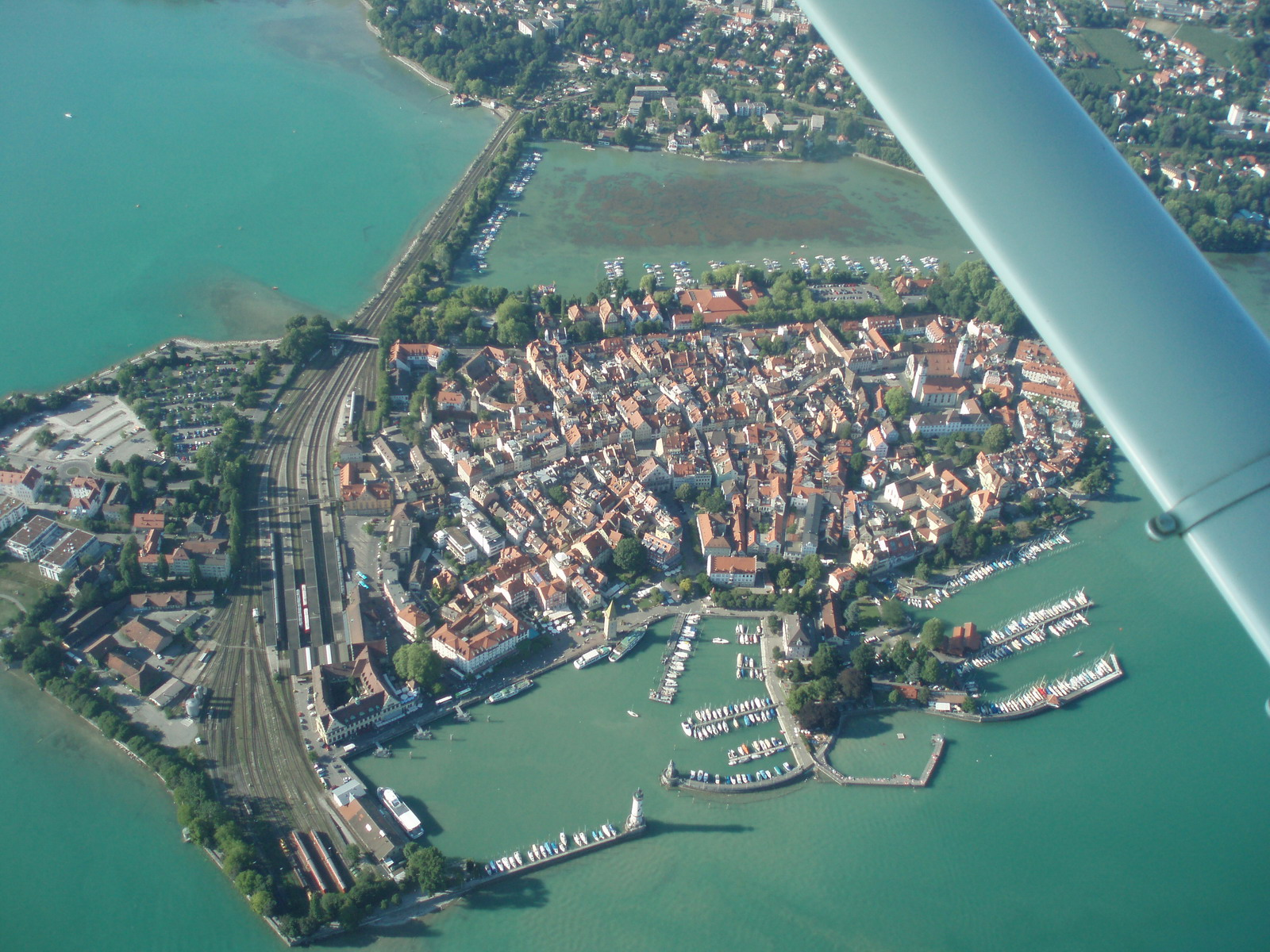

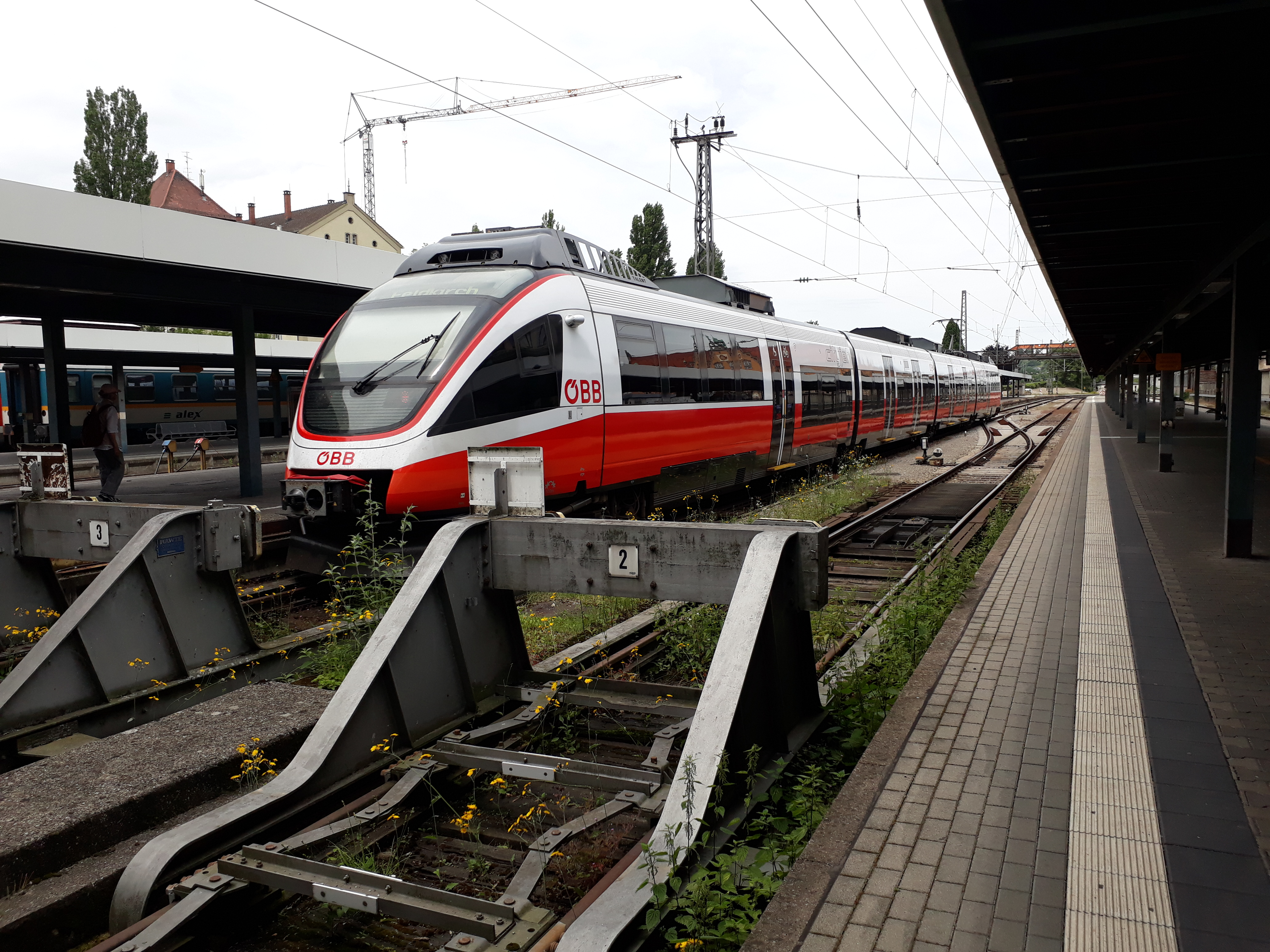
Vorarlberg S-Bahn at Lindau-Insel station

== See also ==
- Rail transport in Germany
