= Bregenz railway station =

Railway station in Vorarlberg, Austria

Bregenz
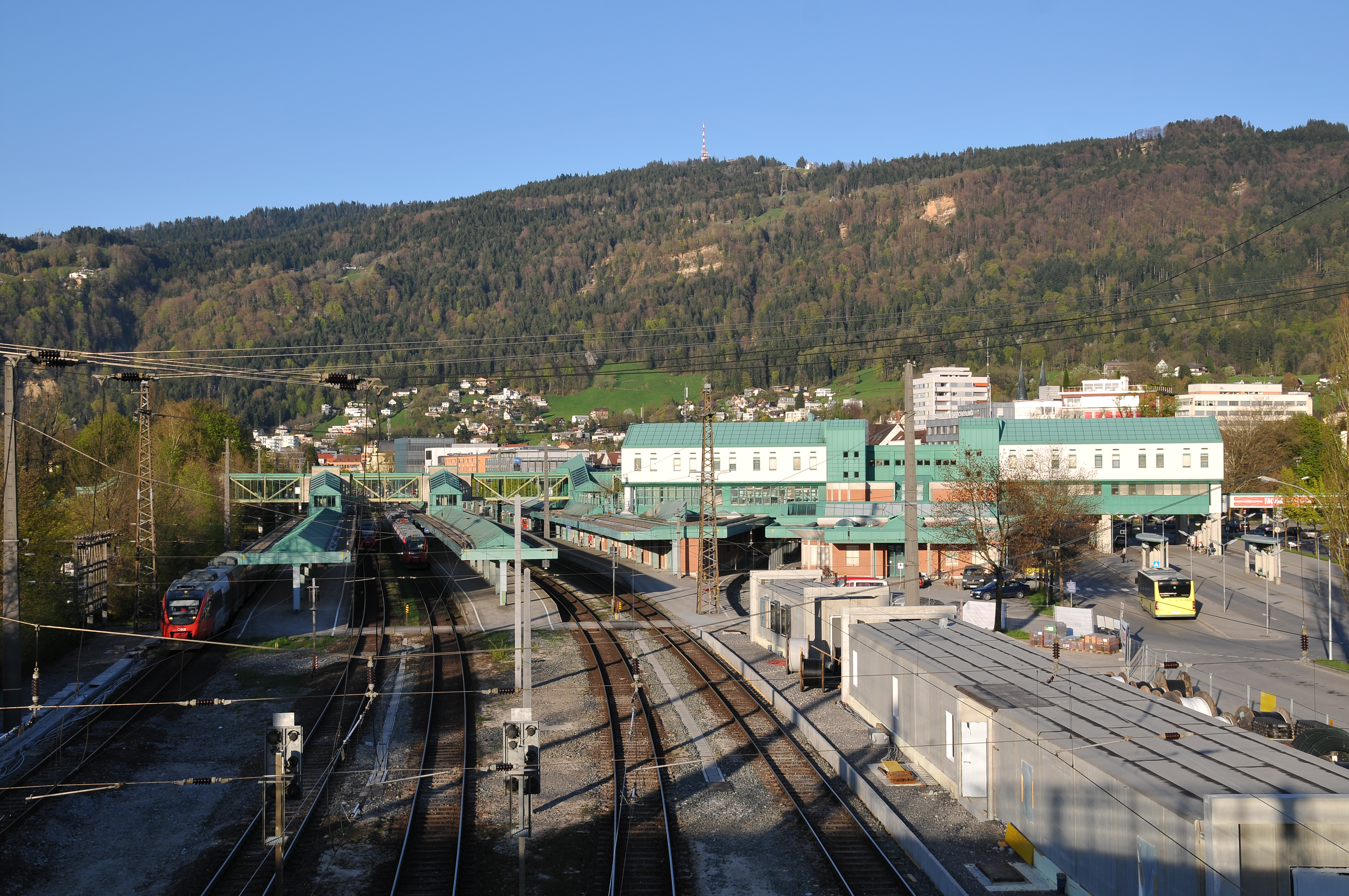
- The station in 2013

General information
- Location: Bregenz, Vorarlberg; Austria
- Coordinates: 47°30′10″N 9°44′22″E
- Owner: Austrian Federal Railways (ÖBB)
- Line: Vorarlberg line
- Distance: 10.4 km (6.5 mi) from St. Margrethen
- Platforms: 3
- Tracks: 5
- Train operators: ÖBB, WESTbahn, DB, Swiss Federal Railways, Thurbo
- Connections: Local buses

Services
Preceding station	DB Fernverkehr	Following station
Lindau-Reutin towards Dortmund Hbf	ICE 62 Bodensee	Dornbirn towards Innsbruck Hbf
Preceding station	SBB CFF FFS	Following station
St. Margrethen towards Zürich HB	EuroCity	Lindau-Reutin Continues as DB ECE 88 towards München Hbf
Preceding station	ÖBB	Following station
Dornbirn towards Vienna Airport	Railjet Express	Terminus
Dornbirn towards Wien Hauptbahnhof	Nightjet	Terminus
Bregenz Riedenburg towards Bludenz	REX 1	Bregenz Hafen towards Lindau-Insel
Preceding station		Following station
Bregenz Riedenburg toward Wien Westbahnhof	WESTbahn	Lindau-Reutin toward Lindau-Insel
Preceding station	Vorarlberg S-Bahn	Following station
Bregenz Riedenburg towards Bludenz	S1	Bregenz Hafen towards Lindau-Insel
Bregenz Riedenburg towards St. Margrethen	S3	Terminus
Preceding station	St. Gallen S-Bahn	Following station
St. Margrethen towards Weinfelden	S7	Lindau-Reutin towards Lindau-Insel
Location
- Location within Austria Location within Vorarlberg

Bregenz railway station (German: Bahnhof Bregenz) is a railway station in the municipality of Bregenz, located in the Bregenz district in Vorarlberg, Austria, on the southeastern shore of Lake Constance. It is an intermediate stop on the Vorarlberg line of Austrian Federal Railways (ÖBB).

The station is located ca. 1.2 km (0.75 mi) away from the valley station of the Pfänderbahn, an aerial tramway to Mount Pfänder.

== Services ==
Several trains operate on the Vorarlberg line to the southern part of Vorarlberg and other parts of Austria or to Lindau in Germany. The Vorarlberg line is linked to the St. Margrethen–Lauterach line at Lauterach, with direct services from Bregenz station to Switzerland.

As of the December 2024 timetable change, the following services stop at Bregenz (local trains are also part of Bodensee S-Bahn):

- Railjet (RJ/RJX) and EuroCity (EC/ECE):
  - EuroCity (EC): seven trains per day between Zürich HB and München Hbf (runs as ECE 88 in Germany).
- Intercity-Express ICE 62: one train-pair per day between Dortmund Hbf and Innsbruck Hbf.
- Nightjet (NJ): daily overnight train to Wien Hbf.
- WESTbahn green: one train per day and direction to Lindau-Insel and Wien Westbahnhof.
- REX 1: hourly to half-hourly service between Feldkirch and Lindau-Insel; many trains continue from Feldkirch to Bludenz.
- Vorarlberg S-Bahn:
  - S1: half-hourly service between Bludenz and Bregenz Hafen, with some trains continuing to Lindau-Insel.
  - S3: half-hourly service to St. Margrethen.
- St. Gallen S-Bahn S7 (REX 7): service every two hours on weekends and some service during the week between Romanshorn and Lindau-Insel.

== See also ==
- Lake Constance
  - Obersee (Lake Constance)
- Rail transport in Austria
