= Vorarlberg Railway =

Railway line in Austria and Germany

Coordinates: 47.2201°N 9.6392°E

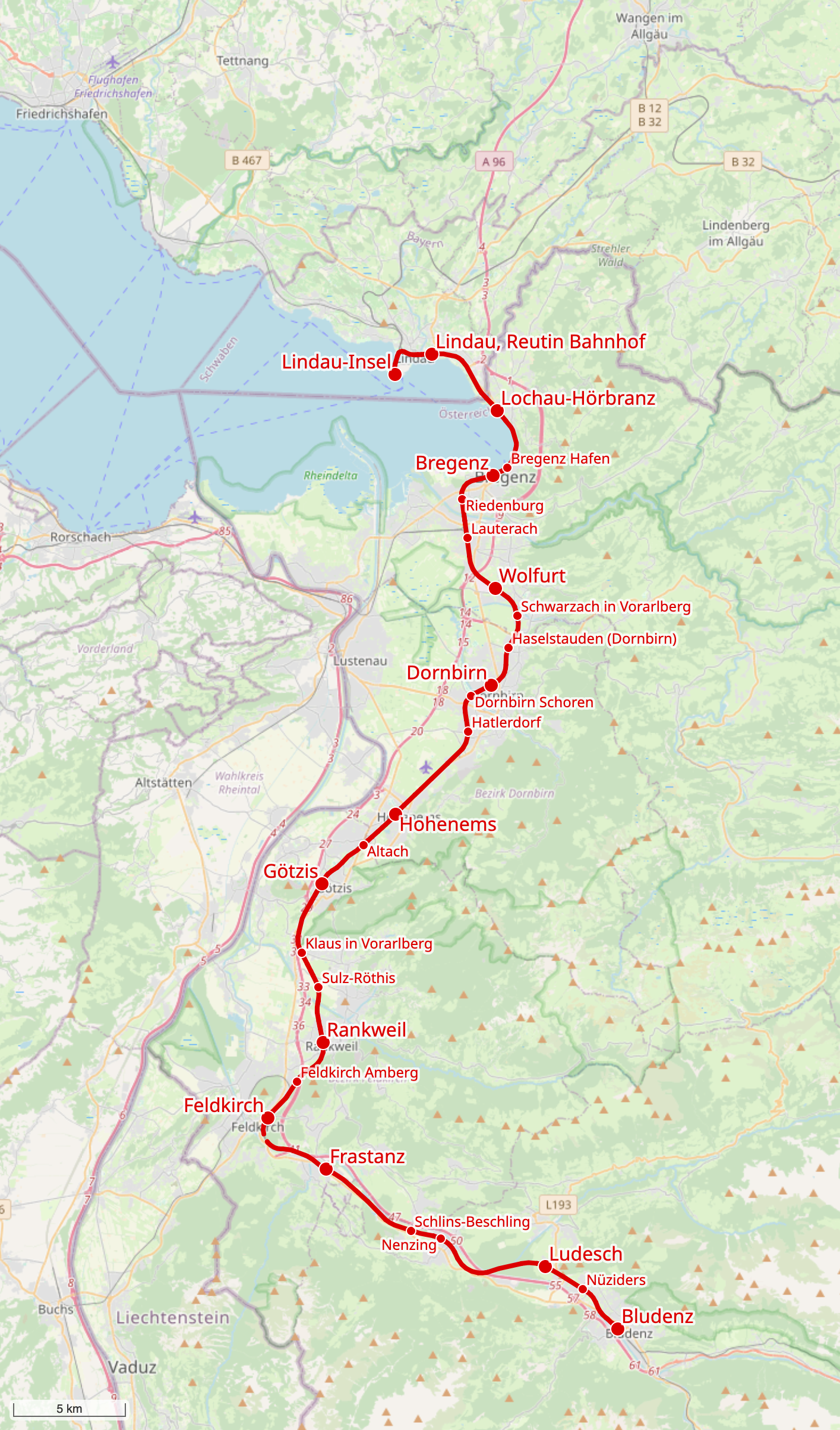

Overview
- Native name: Vorarlbergbahn
- Line number: 5420
- Locale: Vorarlberg, Austria; Bavaria, Germany
- Termini: Lindau-Insel, Bavaria, Germany; Bludenz, Vorarlberg, Austria

Service
- Route number: 101 05

Technical
- Line length: 67.746 km (42.095 mi)
- Number of tracks: 2: Lindau–Lochau-Hörbranz; 2: Bregenz–Bludenz
- Track gauge: 1,435 mm (4 ft 8 1/2 in) standard gauge
- Minimum radius: 321 m (1,053 ft)
- Electrification: 15 kV 16.7 Hz
- Operating speed: 160 km/h (100 mph) (maximum)
- Maximum incline: 1.4%

The Vorarlberg Railway (German: Vorarlbergbahn) denotes a railway line running in north-south direction through the Austrian state of Vorarlberg and extending to Lindau (Germany). Its route is similar to the Rheintal/Walgau Autobahn, from Lindau to the border and to Bludenz, where it connects to the Arlberg Railway and Bludenz–Schruns railway (Montafonerbahn) lines. The entire route in Austria is owned and is operated up to Lindau-Insel by the Austrian Federal Railways (Österreichische Bundesbahnen, ÖBB). Services of Vorarlberg S-Bahn, one service of St. Gallen S-Bahn and EuroCity trains of Swiss Federal Railways (SBB) also use a part of the line.

The Vorarlberg Railway is the western continuation of the Arlberg Railway (ÖBB timetable number AT 401) through the Walgau valley and the Vorarlberg section of the Rhine Valley.

== Operations ==
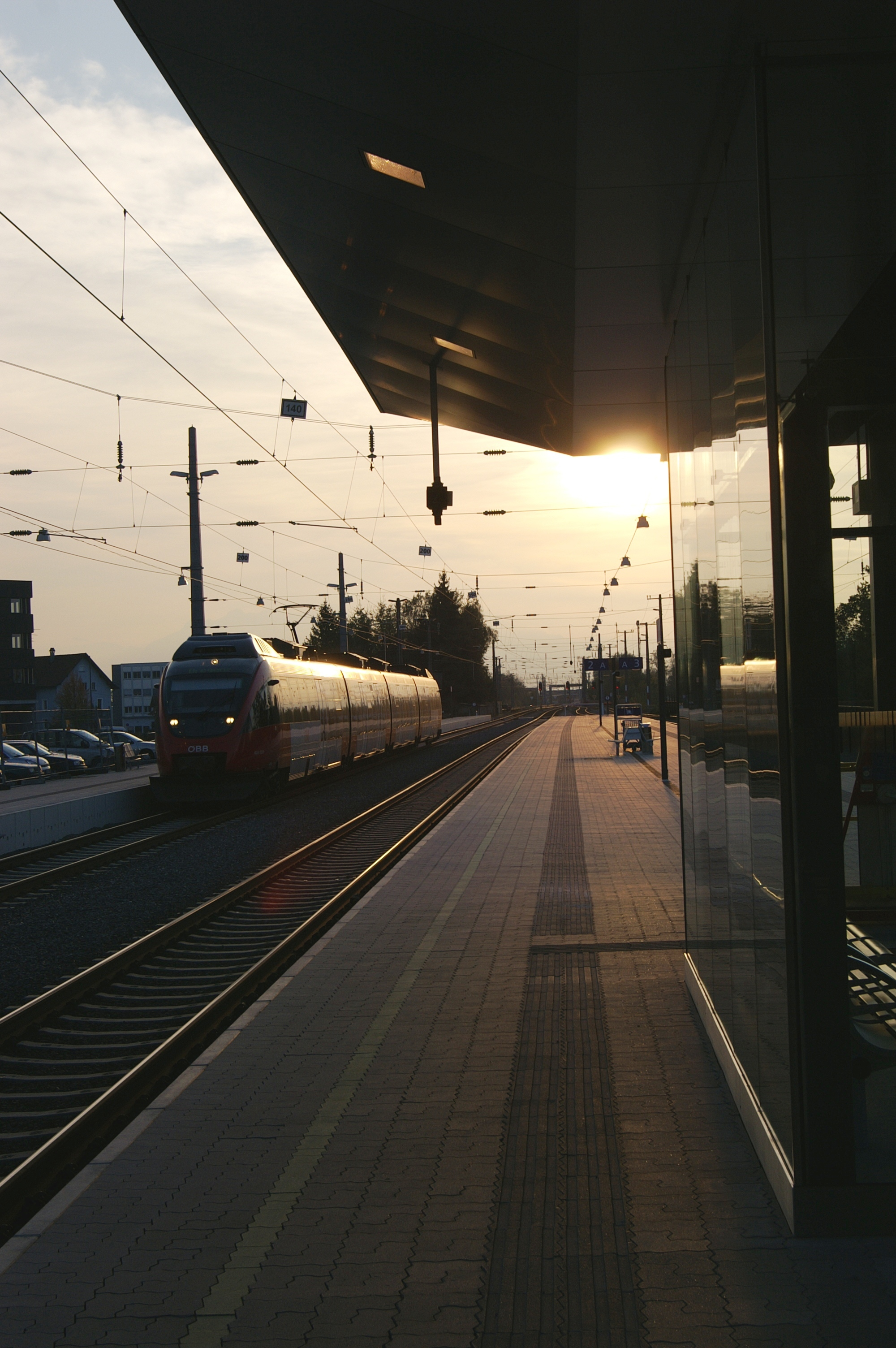
Class 4024 running as an S-Bahn service at the entrance of Dornbirn station

As of the December 2023 timetable change, the following services operate on the Vorarlberg railway or sections thereof (S-Bahn services also operate for Bodensee S-Bahn):

- Eurocity (EC):
  - ECE 88 two-hourly between Lauterach junction and Lindau-Reutin.
  - Transalpin: Zürich HB–Graz: single round trip per day between Feldkirch and Bludenz.
- Railjet (RJ/RJX):
  - Frankfurt–Vienna Airport: one round-trip per day using the whole line.
  - Bregenz–Wien Hbf/Vienna Airport: six trains per day between Bregenz and Bludenz.
  - Zürich HB–Bratislava-Petržalka/Budapest Keleti: four round trips per day between Feldkirch and Bludenz.
- Nightjet (NJ):
  - Bregenz–Wien Hbf: daily overnight train using the whole line.
- REX 1: hourly to half-hourly service between Feldkirch and Lindau-Insel; many trains continue from Feldkirch to Bludenz.
- Vorarlberg S-Bahn
  - S1: half-hourly service between Bludenz and Bregenz Hafen, with some trains continuing to Lindau-Insel.
  - S3: on weekdays, half-hourly service between Lauterach junction to Bregenz; service is hourly on weekends.
  - R5: on weekdays, three trains per day between Feldkirch and Lauterach junction.
- St. Gallen S-Bahn
  - S7: every two hours on weekends, some service during the week, between Lauterach junction and Lindau-Reutin.

== History ==
=== Planning phase ===
Already in 1847, the entrepreneur Carl Ganahl, later the main proponent of the railway construction in the Vorarlberg, recognised the importance of a railway line in the Vorarlberg, although there were many problems with this idea. No mountain railway, which would be needed to cross the Arlberg, had yet been built in Austria and a line with no connection to the Tyrolean areas seemed useless. Moreover, Vorarlberg was not an independent crown land of Austria-Hungary, and thus possessed no representatives in the Imperial Council (Reichsrat) in Vienna.

Operations commenced on the Bavarian Ludwig South-North Railway to Lindau in 1853 and the Swiss lines from Rorschach to Rheineck and from Rheineck to Chur opened in 1857. On the Austrian side the line from Kufstein to Innsbruck via Wörgl was connected to the railway network in 1859. In 1856, the president of the newly formed association now called the Vorarlberg Chamber of Trade and Commerce, Carl Ganahl signed a petition for approval of the preliminary work. He allowed only two years for the preparation of the first detailed design for the project, which he paid for out of his own pocket. In the same year he made a formal application for a license for the project to the Imperial and Royal (kaiserlich und königlich) Ministry of Commerce. There the application was postponed temporarily because consultation had to be held first with the neighbouring states. This meant that it would be as late as 1865 before the signing of treaties could be concluded.

Previously, in 1864, the Ministry of Commerce had submitted a railway construction programme that would also include for the first time the construction of a line from Innsbruck to Dornbirn. In March 1867, the first concept of the Vorarlberg side was submitted, which would also accommodate the construction of a tunnel between St. Anton and Langen. The Imperial Council approved the application in 1867, but construction began only on 1 May 1869.

=== Implementation and construction ===
After Carl Ganahl prevailed over two other competitors for the construction contract, work began on the construction of the first railway line in the Vorarlberg in October 1870. The bulk of the construction was carried out in 1871 as some sections could only be built after objections had been dealt with. The newly created corporation of the Royal Vorarlberg Railway (k. k. priv. Vorarlberger Bahn), a Vienna-based company received its license from the Companies Registry on 5 May 1871, its statutes were approved on 9 June, its constitution on 3 July and it was entered in the companies register on 8 July. It would have a virtually unlimited capital, since its shares were oversubscribed twenty times.

The first ceremonial run on the Bludenz–Lochau line (neal Bregenz) was hauled by a steam locomotive, which had been given the name of Bregenz, on 30 June 1872. Finally, the line was handed over for public service on 1 July 1872. The railway was finally connected to the rest of the Austrian railway network by the construction of the Arlberg Railway Tunnel in 1884. The link to Buchs and to Lindau opened on 14 October 1872 and the connection to St. Margrethen opened on 23 November 1872. The first continuous express ran on the route on 1 November 1873, running on the route from Zurich Main Station to Munich. The Vorarlberg Railway's connection with the rest of the Austrian railway network also meant the end of its era of independence as it became state-owned.

The railway line was completely electrified in 1954. The section from Bludenz to Feldkirch was duplicated in 1991, followed by the line Feldkirch to Bregenz in 1995. The section from Lochau/Hörbranz to Bregenz-Hafen is still only single-track.

== Construction and engineering ==
The main route of the line, with the exception of the Bregenz–Lochau section, is duplicated and fully electrified, while the section from the state border to Lindau-Insel station represents a special case in that the overhead electrical line was built by the ÖBB workshop in Bludenz to German regulations. Until 2020, there was no connection in Germany to the German railway electrical network and this section was supplied with current from Austria. For this reason (and because Lindau-Insel station (formerly called Lindau Hauptbahnhof) is a terminal station) almost all international trains had to switch from the electrical locomotives of Swiss Federal Railways (SBB) or ÖBB to the diesel locomotives of Deutsche Bahn (or vice versa) in Lindau. The lines to Munich and to Friedrichshafen (Bodensee-Gürtelbahn and Wuerttemberg Southline) are now electrified and all trains now run via a rebuilt station at Lindau-Reutin, which does not require reversal.

== Feldkirch–Buchs connecting line ==
At the northern end of Feldkirch station a single-track, electrified, 18.5 km line branches to Buchs from Bregenz. Although this line runs through the territory of Liechtenstein and Switzerland, it is completely operated and maintained by the ÖBB.

In Buchs comes it connects with the St. Gallen–St. Margrethen–Sargans–Chur line of the SBB. Together with that part of the main line from Bludenz to Feldkirch, this connecting line is also an important part of the east–west EuroCity connection between Vienna and Zurich. However, a change direction in Buchs and a change locomotives from ÖBB to SBB (or vice versa) is also required.

== Lauterach–St. Margrethen link ==
In the area of Lauterach station a triangular junction was created to connect to Switzerland. The link from Feldkirch to Switzerland is only used by freight trains to Switzerland or to the petroleum storage of OMV in Lustenau, while the link from Bregenz is used primarily by passenger trains and is part of the major route between Munich and Zurich.

In St.Margrethen the line connects to the St. Gallen–St. Margrethen–Sargans–Chur line of the SBB. Towards St. Gallen no change in direction of the train is required and most international trains between Switzerland and Germany are drawn by SBB locomotives, which have special pantographs for ÖBB and DB lines.

== See also ==
- Rail transport in Austria
