= St. Margrethen railway station =

Railway station in the canton of St. Gallen at Austria–Switzerland border

St. Margrethen
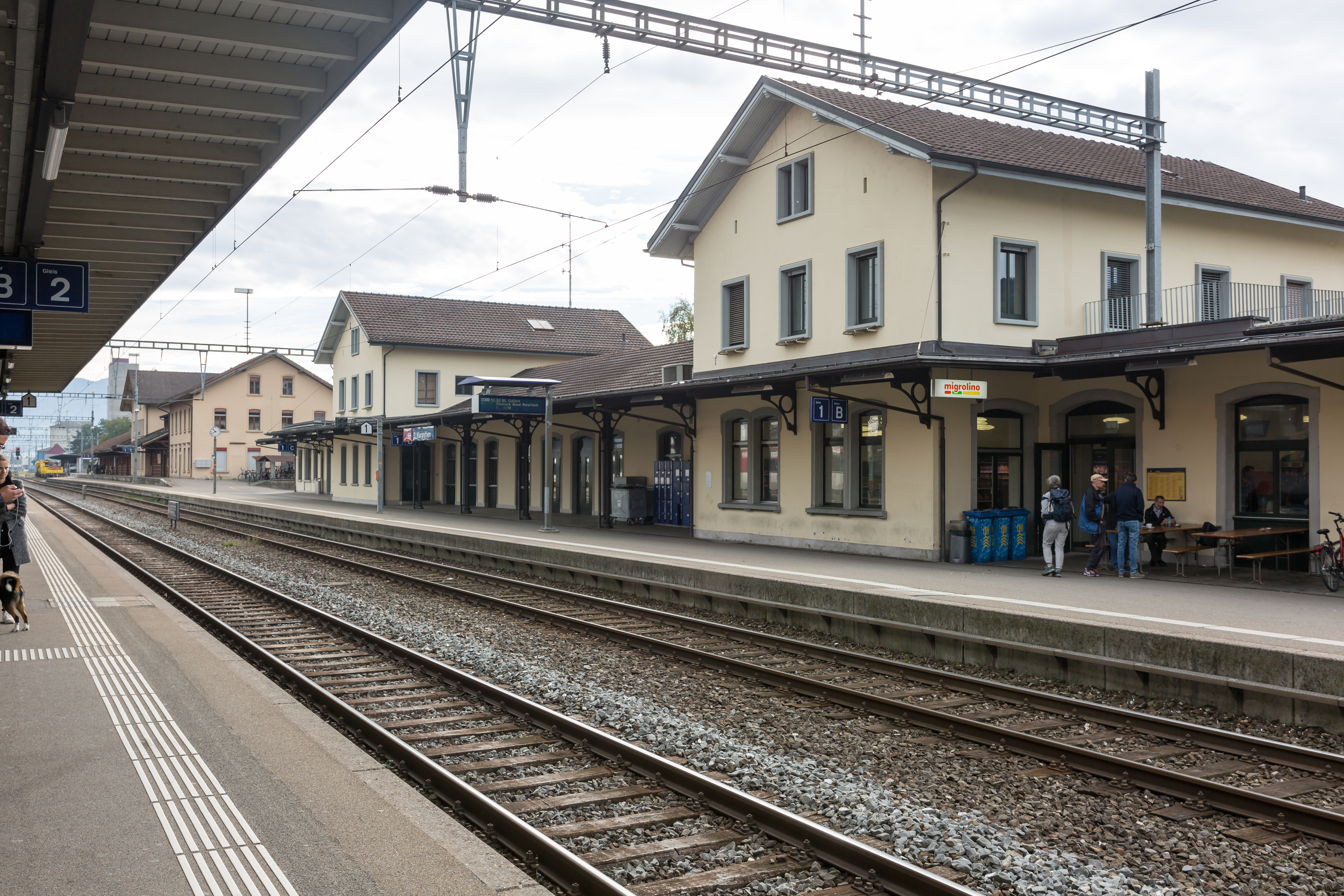
- The station building in 2018

General information
- Other names: St. Margrethen SG
- Location: St. Margrethen; Switzerland
- Coordinates: 47°27′12″N 9°38′18″E
- Elevation: 402 m (1,319 ft)
- Owner: Swiss Federal Railways
- Lines: Chur–Rorschach line; St. Margrethen–Lauterach line
- Distance: 53.8 km (33.4 mi) from Sargans
- Train operators: Thurbo; Südostbahn; Swiss Federal Railways; Austrian Federal Railways

Other information
- Fare zone: 234 (Tarifverbund Ostwind)
Services
Preceding station	SBB CFF FFS	Following station
St. Gallen towards Zürich HB	EuroCity	Bregenz towards München Hbf
Rorschach towards Zürich HB	IR 13	Heerbrugg towards Sargans
Preceding station	Südostbahn	Following station
Rorschach towards St. Gallen	IR 13 Alpenrhein-Express	Heerbrugg towards Chur
Preceding station	St. Gallen S-Bahn	Following station
Rheineck towards Nesslau-Neu St. Johann	S2	Au SG towards Altstätten SG
Rheineck towards Rapperswil	S4	Au SG towards Sargans
Rheineck towards Weinfelden	S5	Terminus
Rorschach towards Weinfelden	S7	Bregenz towards Lindau-Insel
Rheineck towards Winterthur	SN22 Limited service	Au SG towards Heerbrugg
Preceding station	Vorarlberg S-Bahn	Following station
Terminus	S3	Lustenau towards Bregenz
Terminus	R5	Lustenau towards Feldkirch
Location
- Location within Switzerland Location within Canton of St. Gallen

St. Margrethen railway station (German: Bahnhof St. Margrethen) is a railway station in St. Margrethen, in the Swiss canton of St. Gallen. It is an intermediate stop on the Chur–Rorschach line and the western terminus of the St. Margrethen–Lauterach line to Austria. It is located at the Swiss–Austrian border.

== Services ==
As of the December 2024 timetable change, the following services stop at St. Margrethen:

- EuroCity: six trains per day between Zürich Hauptbahnhof and München Hauptbahnhof, via Bregenz (runs as ECE 88 in Germany).
- : hourly service between Zürich Hauptbahnhof and Chur, half-hourly service between St. Gallen and Chur.
- St. Gallen S-Bahn:
  - S2 / S4: half-hourly service between Wattwil and Altstätten SG via St. Gallen and hourly service to Rapperswil, Sargans, and Nesslau-Neu St. Johann.
  - S5: hourly service to Weinfelden.
  - S7: on weekdays, three trains per day between Romanshorn and Lindau-Reutin; service increases to every two hours on weekends.
- Vorarlberg S-Bahn:
  - S3: on weekdays, half-hourly service to Bregenz; service is hourly on weekends.
  - R5: on weekdays, six trains per day to Dornbirn, three to Feldkirch.

During weekends, the station is served by a nighttime S-Bahn service (SN22), offered by Ostwind fare network, and operated by Thurbo for St. Gallen S-Bahn.

- St. Gallen S-Bahn SN22: hourly service to Winterthur and to Heerbrugg, via St. Gallen.

== See also ==
- Bodensee S-Bahn
- Rail transport in Switzerland
