= Dornbirn railway station =

Railway station in Vorarlberg, Austria

Dornbirn
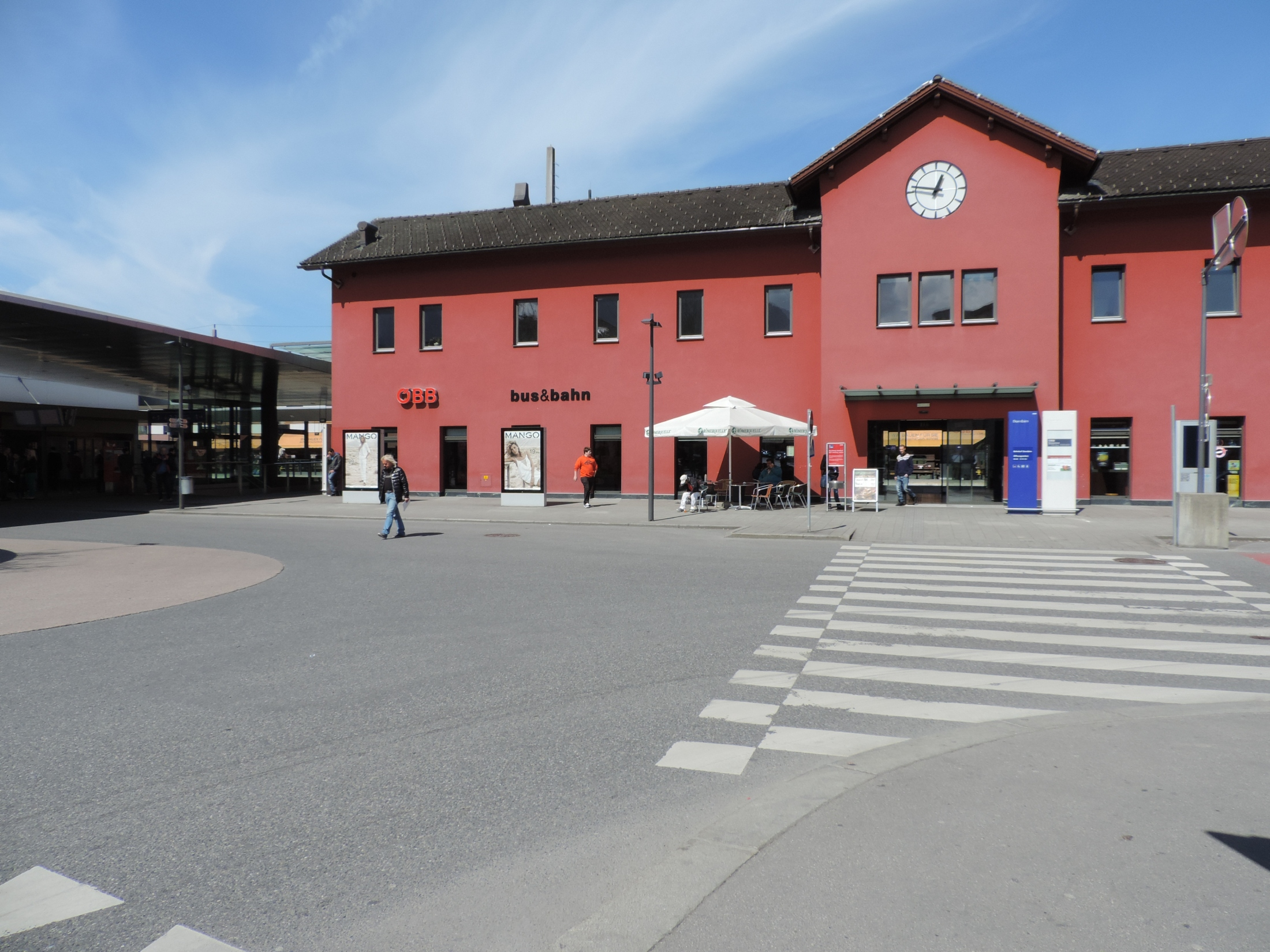
- Station building in 2014.

General information
- Location: Eisenbahnlinie 7; 6850 Dornbirn; Austria
- Coordinates: 47°25′3.0792″N 09°44′20.1084″E
- Elevation: 431 m (AA)
- Owner: Austrian Federal Railways (ÖBB)
- Operator: ÖBB, WESTbahn, DB
- Line: Vorarlberg railway

History
- Opened: 1 July 1872

Services
Preceding station	DB Fernverkehr	Following station
Feldkirch towards Innsbruck Hbf	ICE 62 Bodensee	Bregenz towards Dortmund Hbf
Preceding station	ÖBB	Following station
Feldkirch towards Vienna Airport	Railjet Express	Bregenz Terminus
Feldkirch towards Wien Hbf	Nightjet	Bregenz Terminus
Hohenems towards Bludenz	REX 1	Bregenz Riedenburg towards Lindau-Insel
Preceding station		Following station
Hohenems toward Wien Westbahnhof	WESTbahn	Bregenz Riedenburg toward Lindau-Insel
Preceding station	Vorarlberg S-Bahn	Following station
Dornbirn-Schoren towards Bludenz	S1	Haselstauden towards Lindau-Insel
Dornbirn-Schoren towards Feldkirch	R5	Haselstauden towards St. Margrethen
Location
- Location within Austria Location within Vorarlberg

Dornbirn railway station (German: Bahnhof Dornbirn) is a railway station in Dornbirn in the Dornbirn district of the Austrian federal state of Vorarlberg. It was opened on 1 July 1872, together with the rest of the Vorarlberg railway. The station is owned and operated by the Austrian Federal Railways (ÖBB).

== Services ==
As of the December 2024 timetable change, the following regional train services exist (the S1 and R5 are both also part of Bodensee S-Bahn):

- Intercity-Express ICE 62: one train-pair per day between Dortmund Hbf and Innsbruck Hbf.
- Nightjet (NJ): daily overnight train to Wien Hbf.
- WESTbahn green: one train per day and direction to Lindau-Insel and Wien Westbahnhof.
- REX 1: trains between Bludenz and Lindau-Insel.
- Vorarlberg S-Bahn
  - S1: half-hourly service between Bludenz and Bregenz Hafen, with some trains continuing to Lindau-Insel.
  - R5: on weekdays, seven trains per day to St. Margrethen, three to Feldkirch.

== See also ==
- Rail transport in Austria
