= Vorarlberg S-Bahn =

Transport project in Vorarlberg, Austria

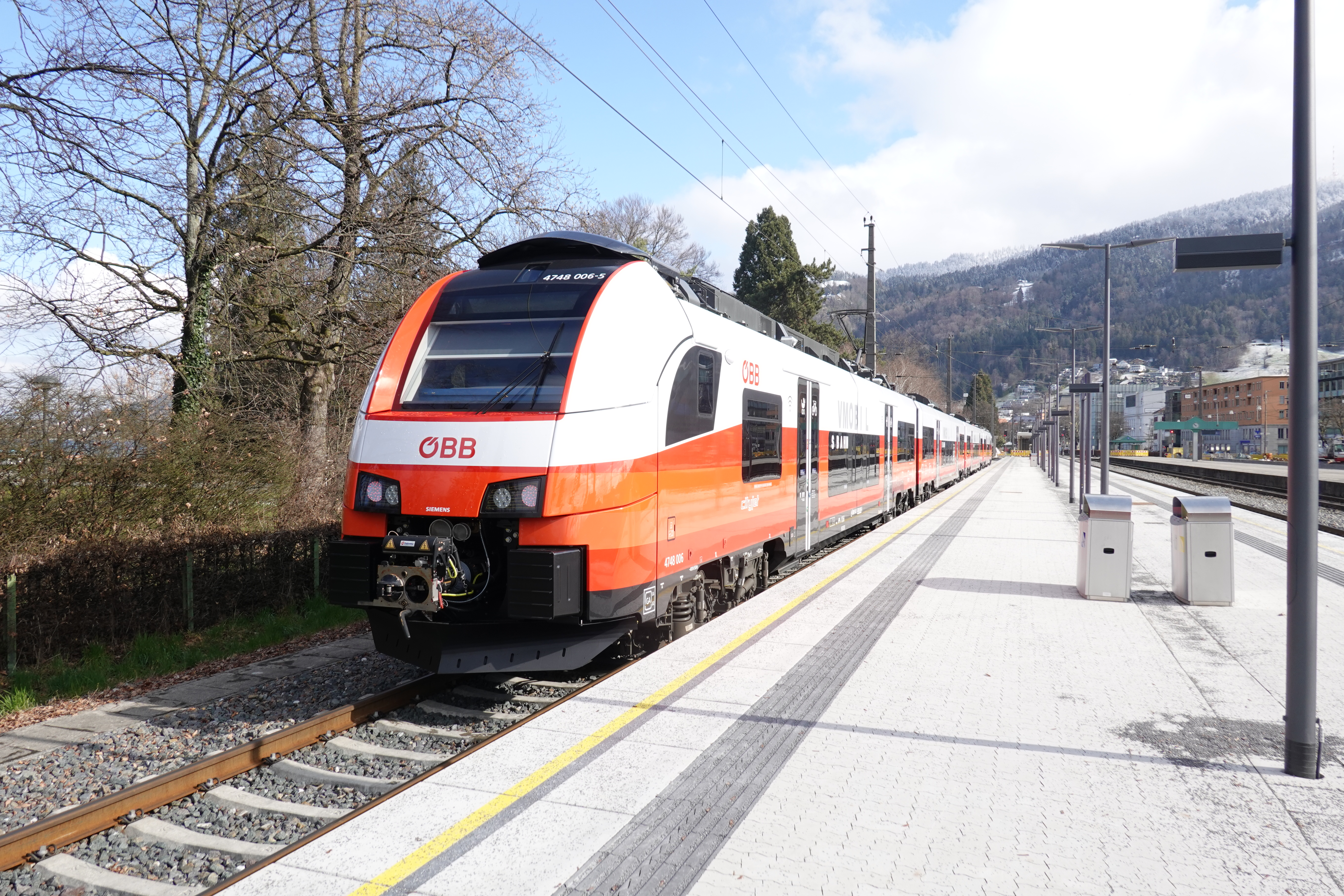
- Above: Siemens Desiro trainset at Bregenz station in 2023; Below: Map of the network in Austria (A), Germany (D), Liechtenstein (FL) and Switzerland (CH)

Overview
- Locale: Vorarlberg, Austria
- Transit type: S-Bahn
- Number of lines: 6

Operation
- Began operation: 2005
- Operators: Austrian Federal Railways (ÖBB); Montafonerbahn (MBS); THURBO

Technical
- System length: 80 km (50 mi)
- Track gauge: 1,435 mm (4 ft 8 1/2 in) standard gauge

Vorarlberg S-Bahn (German: S-Bahn Vorarlberg) is a label for regional rail services in the westernmost Austrian state of Vorarlberg. The S-Bahn services also connect to stations in the German town of Lindau, the Swiss towns of St. Margrethen and Buchs, and the Principality of Liechtenstein.

It is integrated into the Vorarlberg Transport Association (VVV), which manages ticket pricing. Liechtenstein and northeastern Switzerland are within the Ostwind Transport Association transit district. The services are operated by the state-owned Austrian Federal Railways (ÖBB), THURBO (a subsidiary of Swiss Federal Railways) and the privately owned Montafonerbahn (mbs).

Three services (S1, S3, R5) are part of a transnational railway network around Lake Constance (Bodensee) marketed as Bodensee S-Bahn.

== Lines ==
Austrian Federal Railways (ÖBB) operates services S1, S2, S3 and R5 while Montafonerbahn operates line S4. The system is supported by a Regional-Express (REX 1, Lindau-Insel–Bludenz), also operated by ÖBB, and a regional train (S7/RE 7/REX 7, operated by Swiss Federal Railways' subsidiary THURBO). Since 2023, several railway stations on the main line are also served by long-distance trains of WESTbahn to Wien Westbahnhof.

The S1 (which crosses the Austrian-German border), S3 and R5 (which both cross the Austrian-Swiss border), and S7/RE 7/REX 7 (which runs through Austria, Germany and Switzerland) are part of Bodensee S-Bahn.

In Lindau-Insel and Lindau-Reutin, the cross-border S1 service connects with ECE, ICE, IRE, RE and RB services to destinations in Germany. With Buchs SG and St. Margrethen as their western termini, both the S2 and S3 provide cross-border connections to services of S-Bahn St. Gallen and InterRegio (IR) trains to destinations in Switzerland. In Bregenz, Feldkirch and Bludenz, there are connections to RJ and EC services to other cities in Austria, Hungary and Slovakia.

=== S1: Lindau-Insel – Bludenz ===
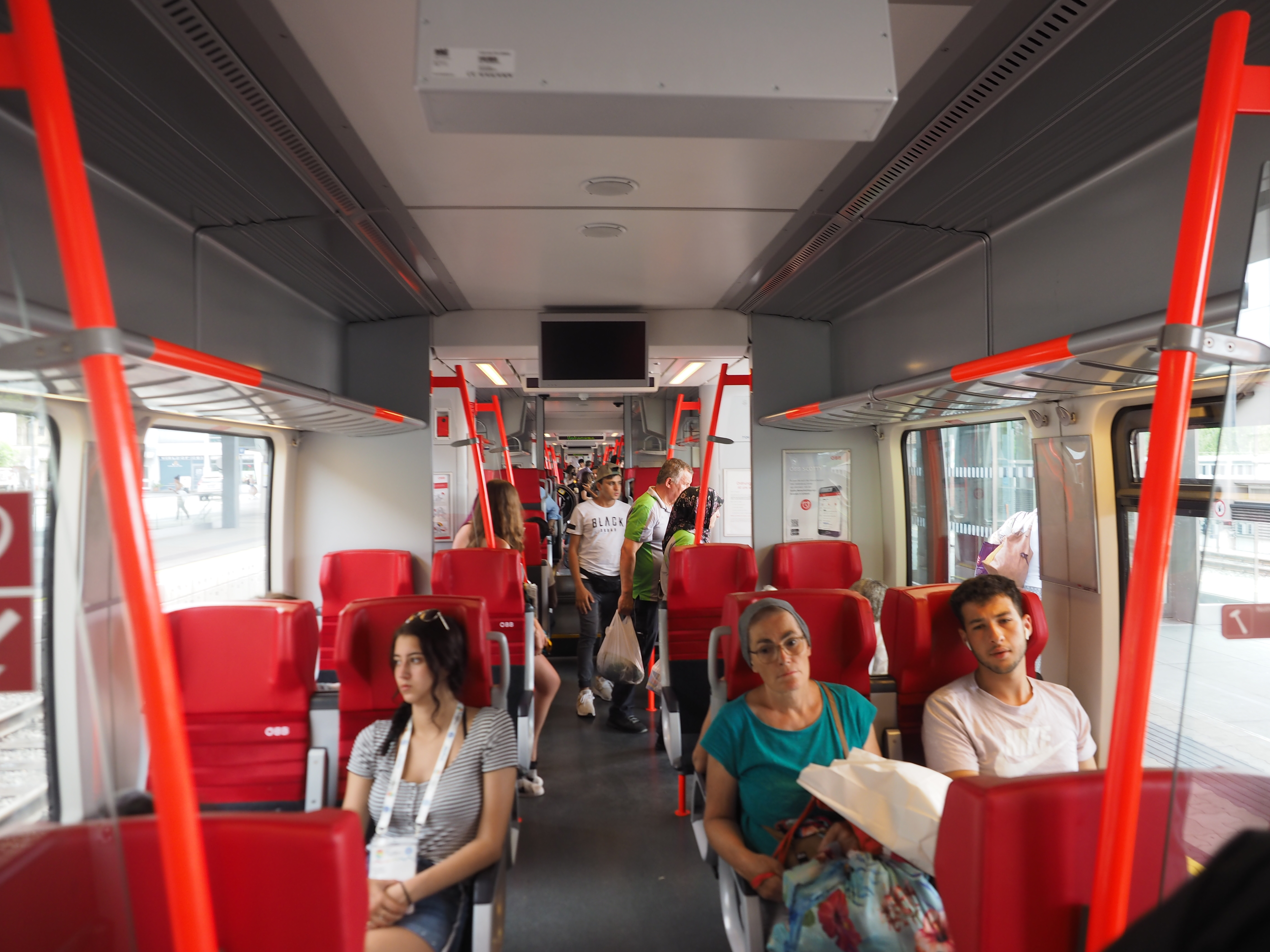
Interior of train operating as S1

The S1 is the busiest of the Vorarlberg S-Bahn's lines. S-Bahn and REX 1 trains run on separate tracks of the Vorarlberg railway line in intervals of less than ten minutes. Since December 2011, between Bregenz and Bludenz there is a time interval of 30 minutes until 23:00. Towards north, the S1 crosses the border and terminates in Lindau (Germany). Some services only operate between Lochau-Hörbranz/Bregenz Hafen and Bludenz.

- S1: Lindau-Insel – Lindau-Reutin – Bregenz – Dornbirn – Feldkirch – Bludenz

=== S2: Feldkirch – Buchs ===
As of December 2023, the S2 service operates over the Feldkirch–Buchs railway, which connects Feldkirch (Austria) with Buchs (Switzerland) via Schaan-Vaduz (Liechtenstein), crossing two country borders. It operates on workdays only and calls at intermediate stations in Vorarlberg and Liechtenstein (except Schaanwald).

- S2: Buchs SG – Schaan-Vaduz – Feldkirch

=== S3: Bregenz – St. Margrethen ===
Trains of S3 service use the St. Margrethen–Lauterach line and Vorarlberg railway and run every half an hour between Bregenz and St. Margrethen, with some hourly services in the mornings and evenings that run to/from Lochau-Hörbranz/Bregenz Hafen. The line was expanded to an almost continuous half-hourly coverage until 2016. The most important metro node along the route is Lustenau. The former R and REX trains on the route became S-Bahn services but retained their old stopping pattern.

- S3: St. Margrethen – Lustenau – Bregenz

=== S4: Schruns – Bludenz ===
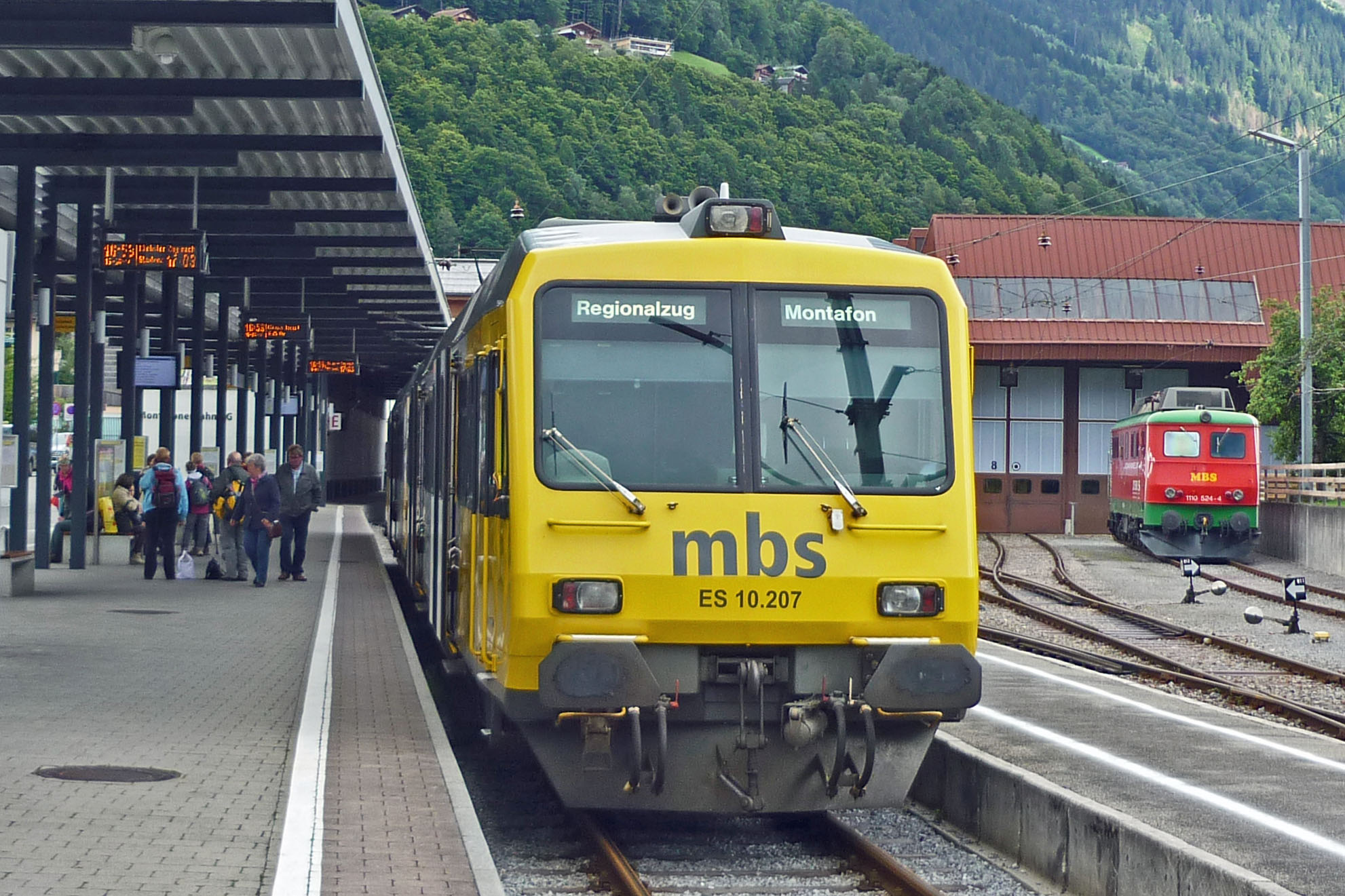
Montafonerbahn in Bludenz in 2014

The S4 service is operated by the Montafonerbahn (mbs). It runs primarily on a half-hourly basis between Bludenz and Schruns and calls at all stations.

- S4: Bludenz – Schruns

=== R5: Feldkirch – St. Margrethen ===
The R5 service runs primarily on an hourly to two-hourly basis. Trains only call at larger stations and some only operate between Dornbirn and St. Margrethen. Previously, only three trains per day continued from Lustenau to St. Margrethen, but now all services continue to that destination.

- R5: (Feldkirch –) Dornbirn – Lustenau – St. Margrethen

=== S7/RE 7/REX 7: Weinfelden – Lindau-Insel ===
Since December 2021, some trains of the S7 service (Weinfelden–Romanshorn–Rorschach) of St. Gallen S-Bahn continue from Romanshorn to Lindau-Reutin (as RE7/REX 7). Since December 2024, services continue to Lindau-Insel. Only every second service continues from Romanshorn to Weinfelden. The trains are operated by Thurbo and only call at major stations between Rorschach and Lindau.

- S7: (Weinfelden – Amriswil –) Romanshorn – Arbon – Rorschach (– St. Margrethen – Bregenz – Lindau-Reutin – Lindau-Insel)

== Establishment ==
In December 2005, the first Bombardier Talents were given S-Bahn branding. However, only VVV timetables designated these services as such. ÖBB ran them as a standard regional service, and only later the S1 and S3 lines took over.

Proposals were underway to upgrade the Feldkirch–Buchs railway, which was already operated by ÖBB, and designate it as part of the S-Bahn network as S2, under the project name "S-Bahn Liechtenstein" (de; formerly S-Bahn FL.A.CH). A Letter of Intent was signed between Austria and Liechtenstein in April 2020.

Since December 2020, mbs' services on the S4 line are also designated as S-Bahn.

Fleet modernization began in 2018 to the ÖBB Cityjet standard. This includes a new paint scheme, new seat covers, and passenger information monitors.

== Rolling Stock ==
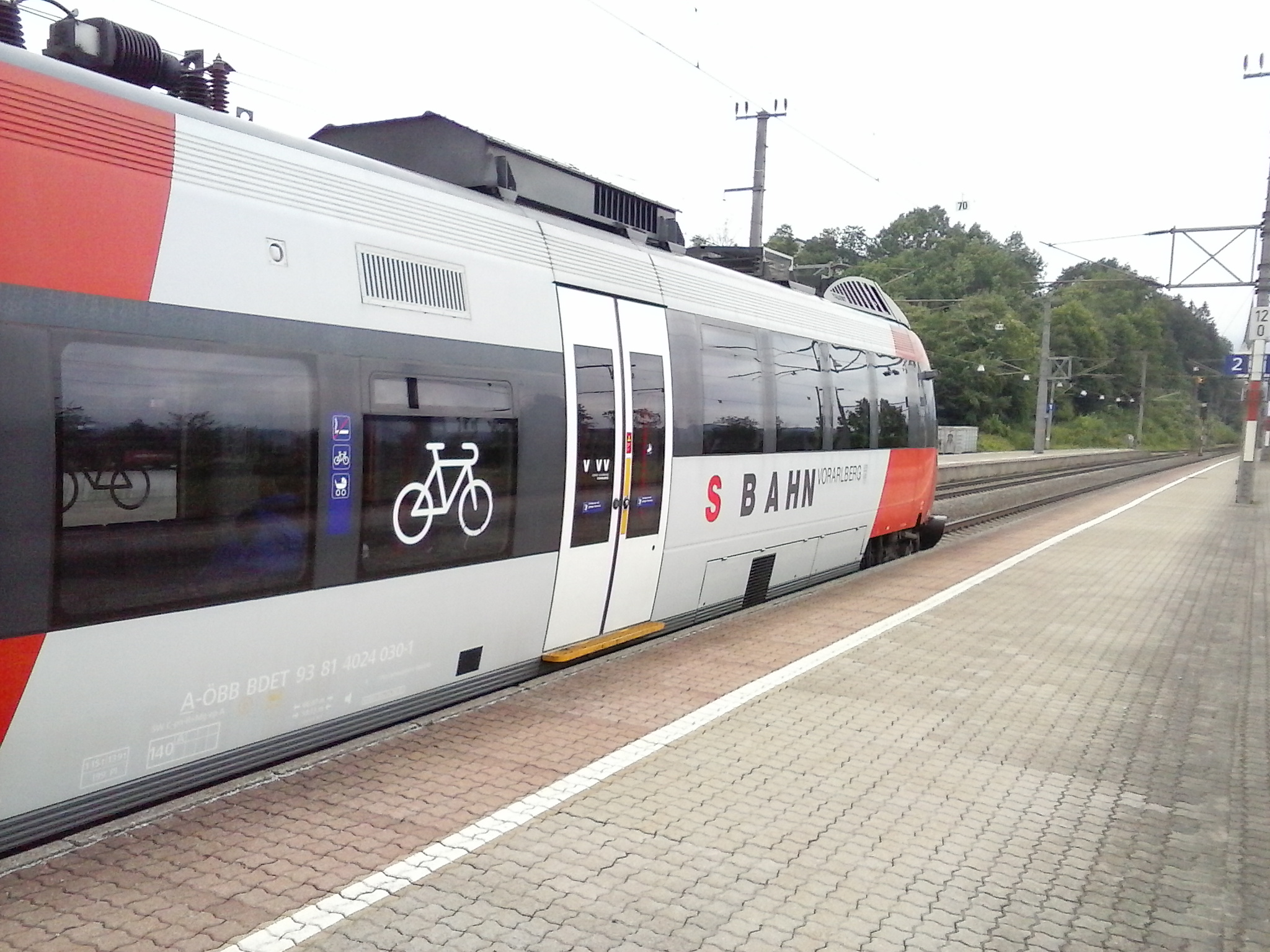
ÖBB 4024 (Bombardier Talent 1) operating for S-Bahn Vorarlberg

ÖBB currently operates Siemens Desiro Cityjets across all its S-Bahn lines, as of 2023. Before, it used 1st-generation Bombardier Talent Class 4024s. ÖBB signed an agreement to purchase up to 300 new Bombardier Talent 3 units for delivery from mid-2019. However, they didn't receive approval, prompting the refurbishment of the existing Talent 1 series. The Talent 3 are now used in Germany.

== See also ==
- Lake Constance Belt Railway
- Rail transport in Austria
- Rail transport in Liechtenstein
- Train categories in Europe
