= Friedrichshafen Ost station =

Railway station in Friedrichshafen, Germany

Friedrichshafen Ost
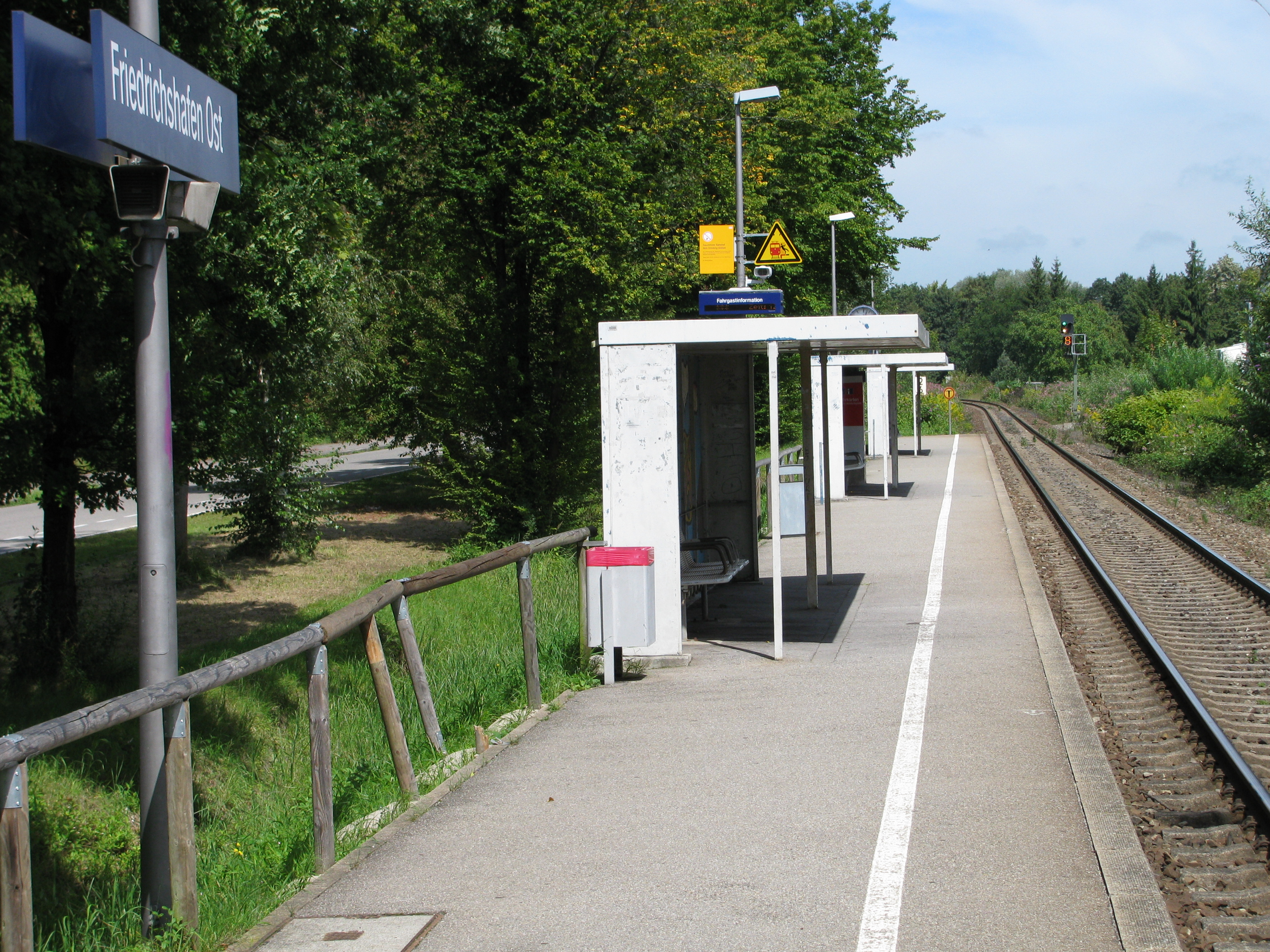
- 2011

General information
- Location: Steinbeisstraße 22; 88046 Friedrichshafen; Baden-Württemberg; Germany
- Coordinates: 47.6516°N 9.5020°E
- Elevation: 399 m (1,309 ft)
- Owner: DB Netz
- Operator: DB Station&Service
- Lines: Lake Constance Belt Railway (KBS 751)
- Platforms: 1 side platform
- Tracks: 1
- Train operators: DB Regio Baden-Württemberg

Other information
- Station code: 1946
- DS100 code: TFOS
- IBNR: 8002030
- Category: 6
- Fare zone: bodo: 10
- Website: www.bahnhof.de

Services
Preceding station	DB Regio Baden-Württemberg	Following station
Friedrichshafen Stadt towards Überlingen Therme	RB 31 Limited service	Eriskirch Terminus
Friedrichshafen Stadt towards Friedrichshafen Hafen	RB 93	Eriskirch towards Lindau-Insel
Location
- Location within Baden-Württemberg

Friedrichshafen Ost station is a railway station in the eastern part of the town of Friedrichshafen, located in the Bodenseekreis district in Baden-Württemberg, Germany.
