= Langenargen station =

Railway station in Langenargen, Germany

Langenargen
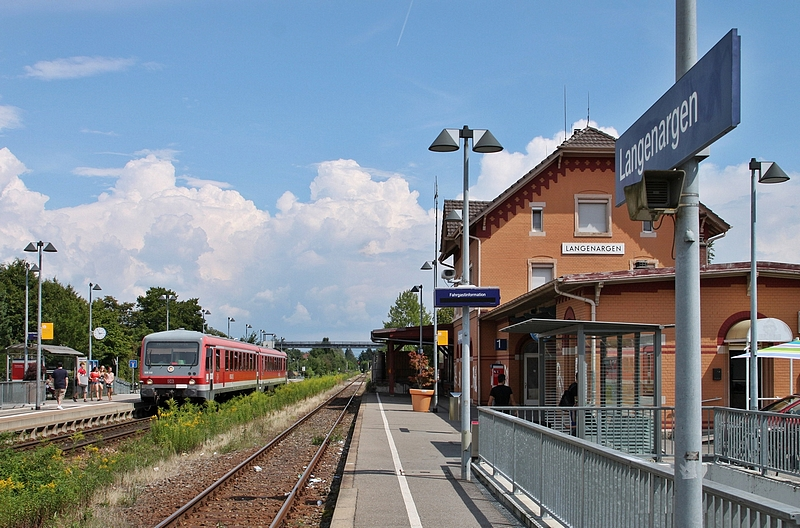
- 2011

General information
- Location: Eisenbahnstraße 18; 88085 Langenargen; Baden-Württemberg; Germany
- Coordinates: 47.5993°N 9.5448°E
- Elevation: 402 m (1,319 ft)
- Owner: DB Netz
- Operator: DB Station&Service
- Lines: Lake Constance Belt Railway (KBS 751)
- Platforms: 2 side platforms
- Tracks: 2
- Train operators: DB Regio

Other information
- Station code: 3525
- DS100 code: TLR
- IBNR: 8003524
- Category: 6
- Fare zone: bodo: 115
- Website: www.bahnhof.de

Services
| Preceding station | DB Regio Baden-Württemberg | Following station |
|---|---|---|
| Friedrichshafen Stadt towards Ulm Hbf or Basel Bad Bf | RE 3 | Nonnenhorn towards Lindau-Reutin |
| Friedrichshafen Stadt towards Stuttgart Hbf | RE 5 Limited service | Kressbronn towards Lindau-Reutin |
| Eriskirch towards Friedrichshafen Hafen | RB 93 | Kressbronn towards Lindau-Insel |
Location
- Location within Baden-Württemberg

Langenargen station is a railway station in the municipality of Langenargen, located in the Bodenseekreis district in Baden-Württemberg, Germany.
