= Stahringen–Friedrichshafen railway =

Railway line in Germany

Stahringen–Lindau

Overview
- Line number: 4331
- Locale: Baden-Württemberg, Germany
- Termini: Stahringen; Lindau-Insel

Service
- Route number: 731

Technical
- Line length: 51.780 km (32.175 mi)
- Track gauge: 1,435 mm (4 ft 8 1/2 in) standard gauge

The Stahringen–Friedrichshafen railway is a non-electrified single-track railway in Baden-Württemberg that runs from Stahringen to Friedrichshafen Stadt. The 51.780 kilometre-long main-line runs mainly along the north shore of Lake Constance (Bodensee) and is part of a route known as the Bodenseegürtelbahn (Lake Constance Belt Railway), connecting Radolfzell and Lindau-Insel.

== History ==
The line was created to close the gap between the network of the Grand Duchy of Baden State Railway (Großherzoglich Badische Staatseisenbahnen) and that of the Royal Württemberg State Railways). After Stahringen was connected to the railway network on 20 July 1867 by the Radolfzell–Mengen railway, the section from Stahringen to Überlingen did not go into operation until 18 August 1895. Finally, Friedrichshafen Stadt station was reached on 2 October 1901. Friedrichshafen had been connected to Ulm by the Ulm–Friedrichshafen railway (Südbahn) since 1847.

On 22 December 1939, there was a great train wreck when a passenger and a freight train collided on the line between Markdorf and Kluftern, resulting in the deaths of 102 people. As earlier the same day two express trains had collided with each other in Genthin in Saxony-Anhalt with (186 deaths), it was the worst day of German railway history.

== Services ==
The line has been served hourly since 2003 by the Seehänsele (the name is derived from See—"lake"—and Hänsele—a local carnival figure) Regional service (RB 31), which does not stop in Stahringen. SWEG Alstom Coradia LINT 54 (class 622) sets have been used for this since September 2019. Previously Stadler Regio-Shuttle RS1 railcars were used. Some trains continue to Singen or to Friedrichshafen Hafen. In addition, every two hours IRE 3 Interregio-Express Sprinter services (class 612 tilting trains) run between Friedrichshafen and Basel Bad (via the High Rhine Railway line), stopping only in Überlingen and Radolfzell on this line.

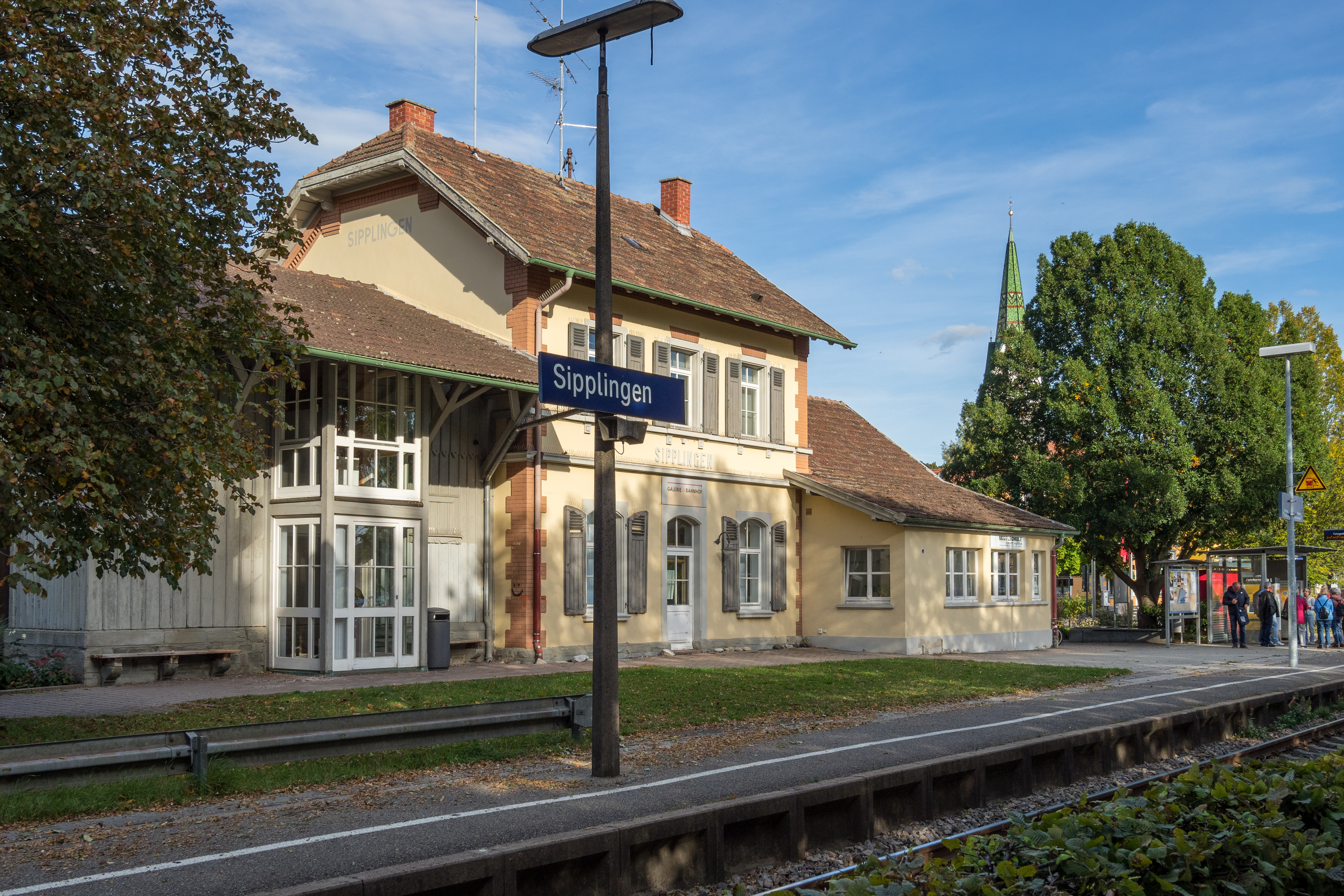
Sipplingen

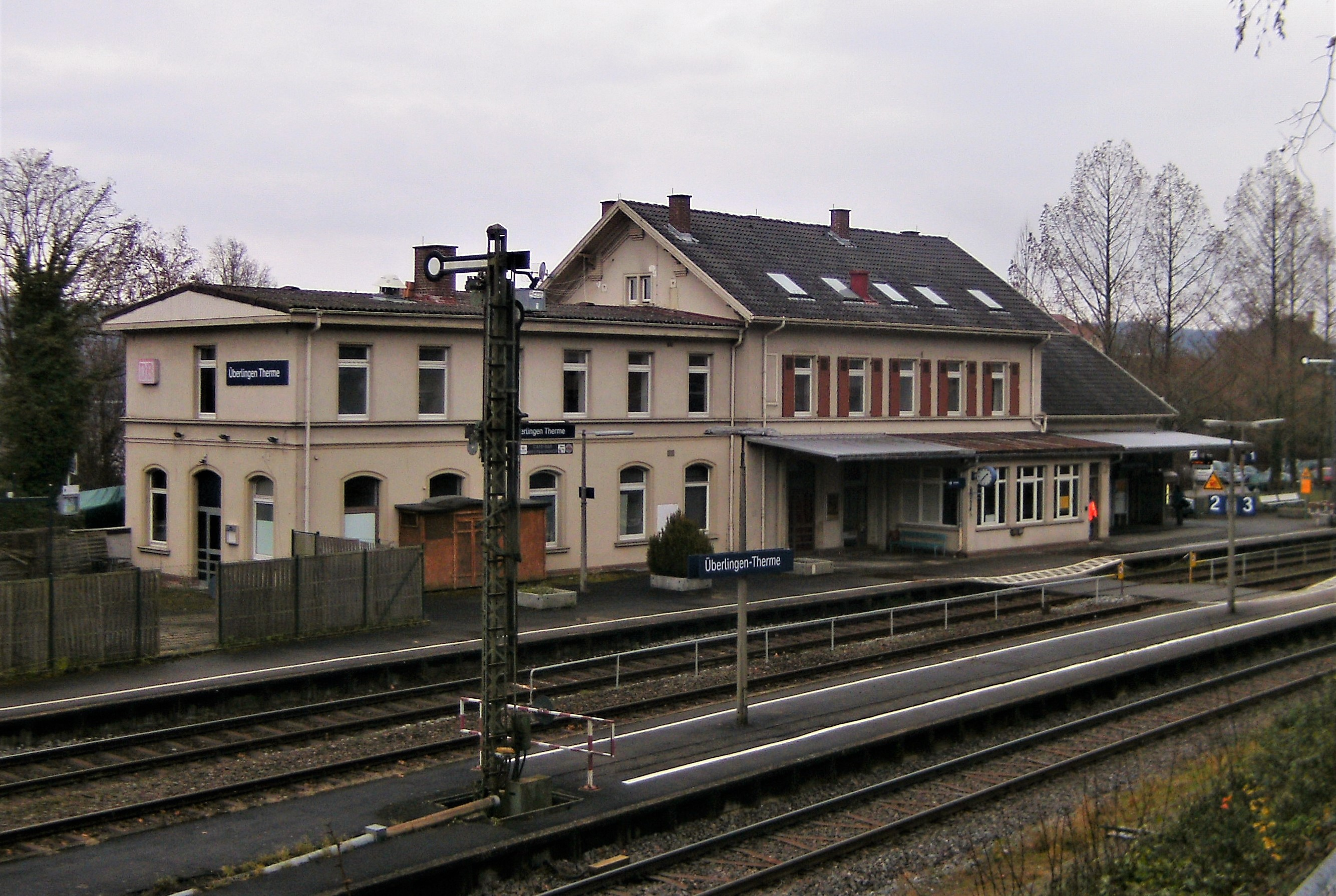
Überlingen Therme

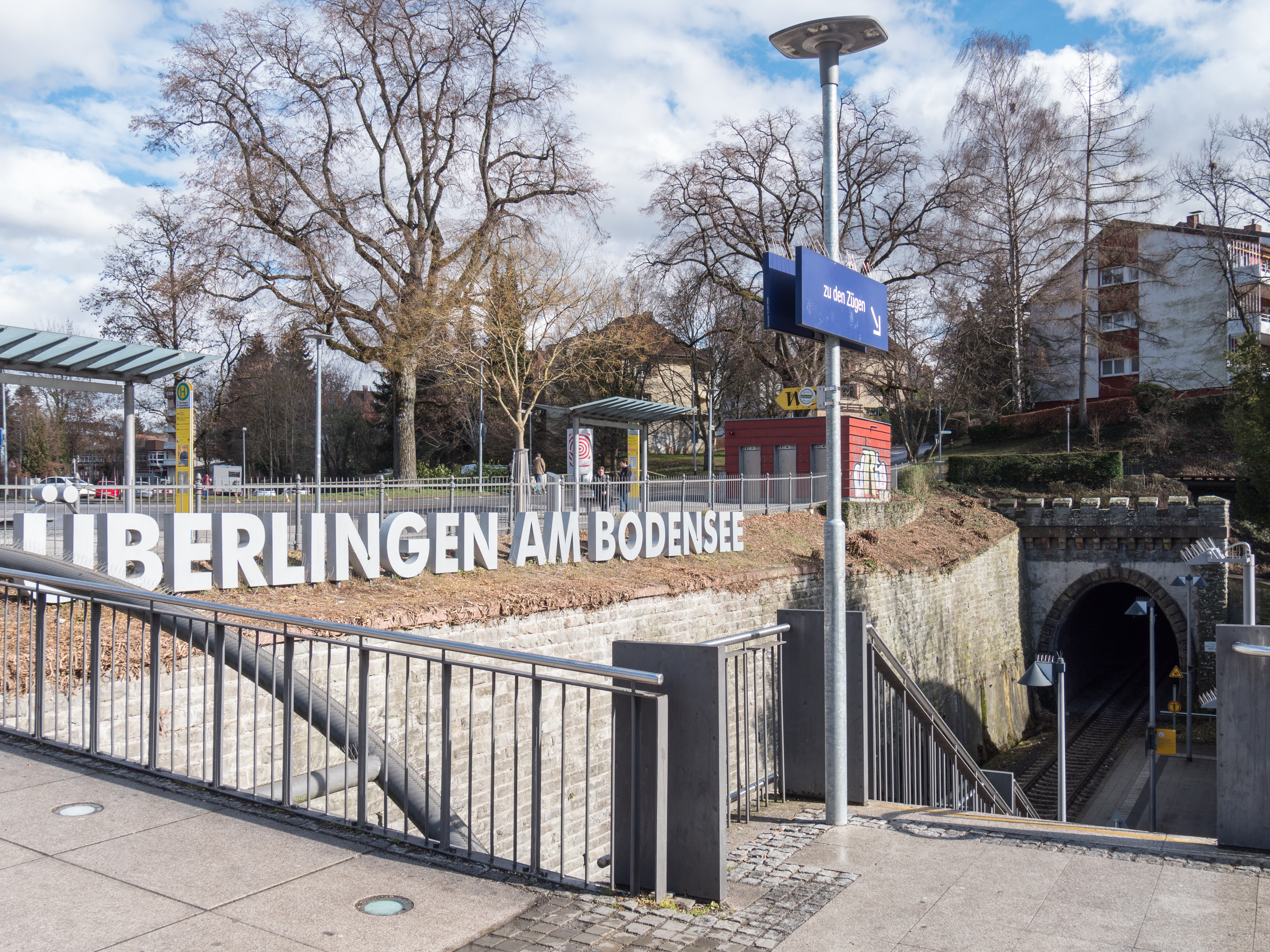
Überlingen

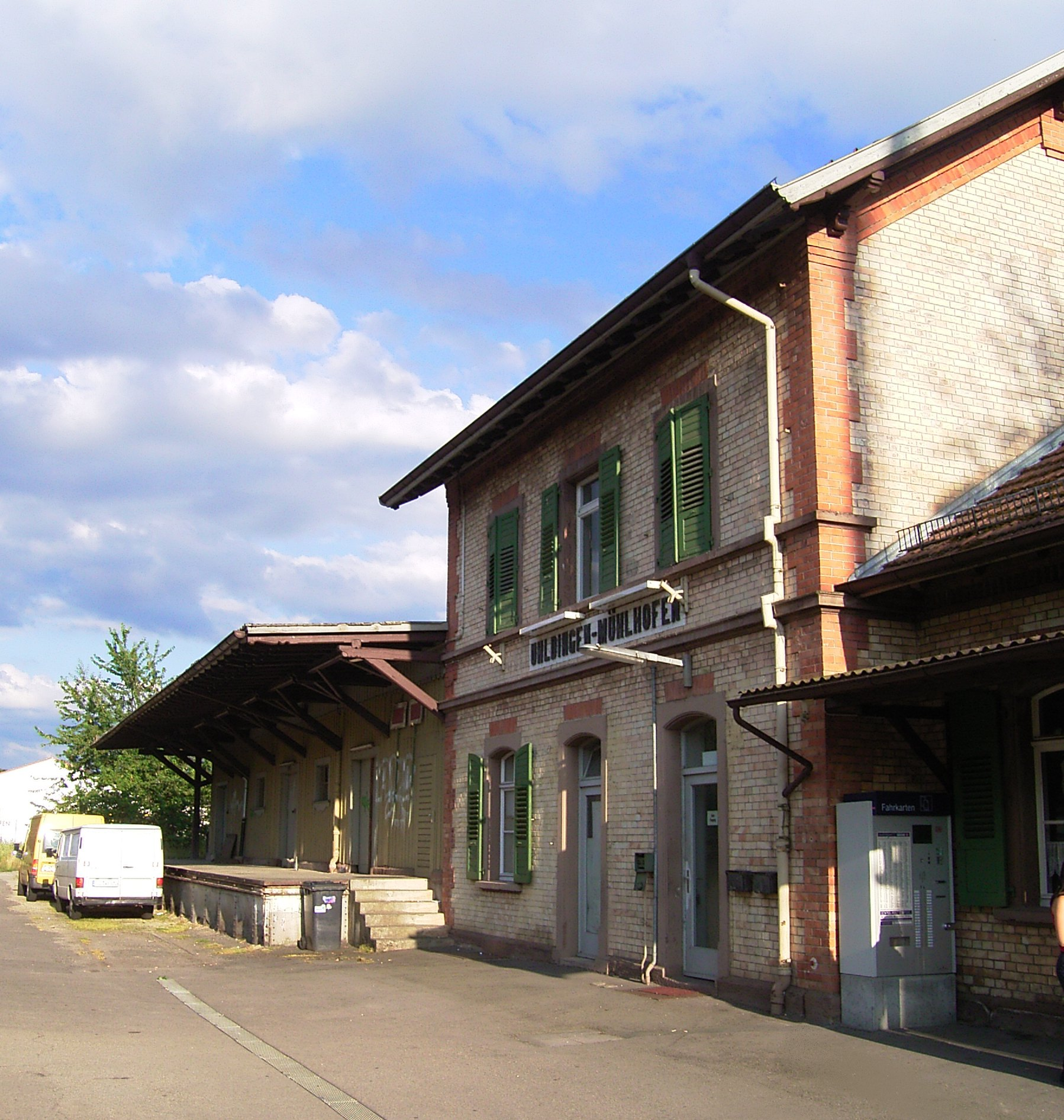
Uhldingen-Mühlhofen

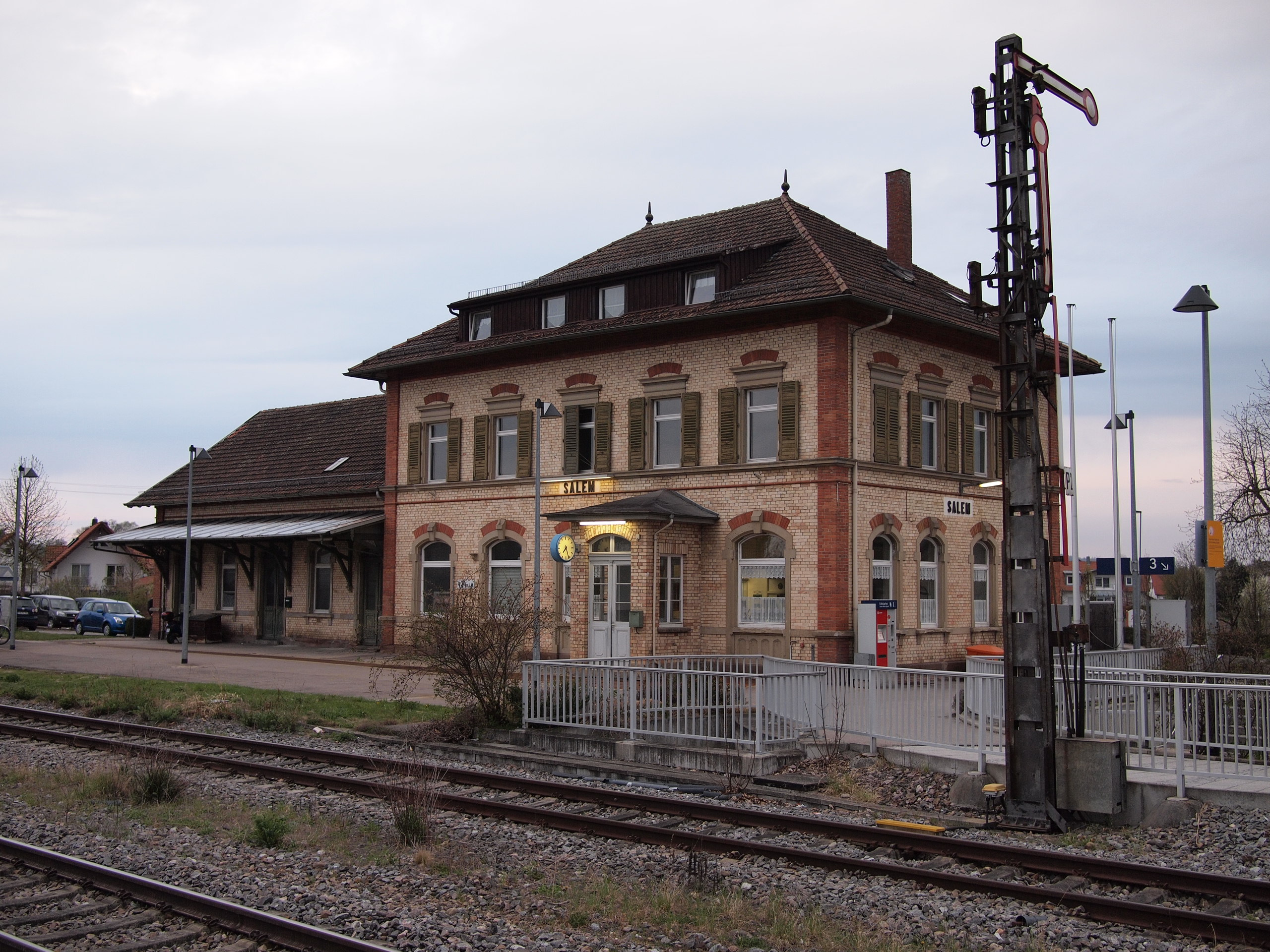
Salem
