= Lake Constance Belt Railway =

Railway route in Germany

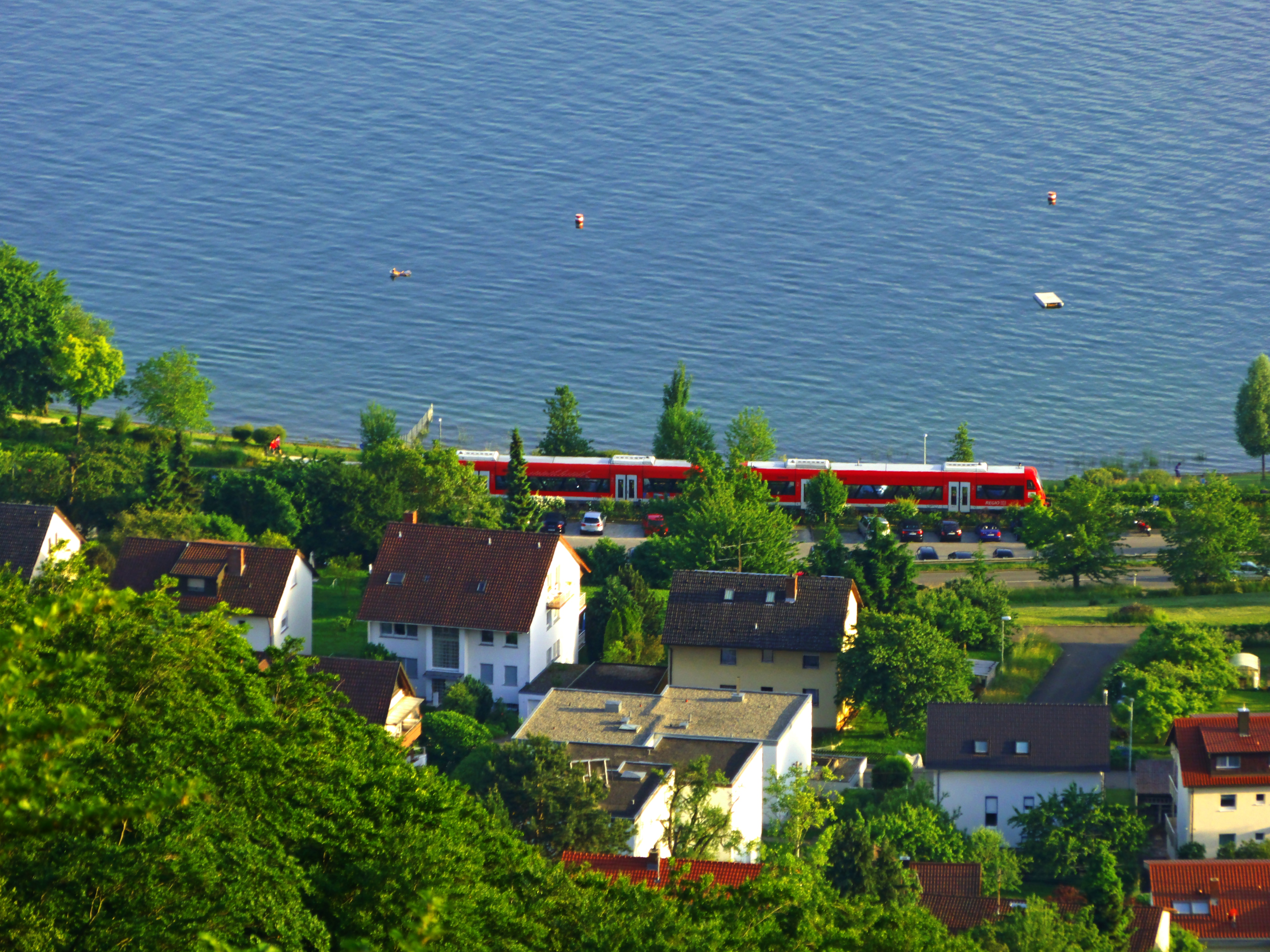
Trainset of DB Regio in Überlingen

Lake Constance Belt Railway (German: Bodenseegürtelbahn) is the name used for several contiguous railway lines, either around the entire Upper Lake of Lake Constance (Bodensee) or only along its northern shore. It was coined around 1900, when the trinational railway ring around the lake (Konstanz–Radolfzell–Friedrichshafen–Lindau–Bregenz–Rorschach–Romanshorn–Konstanz) was completed, but today the term is only used for the line from Radolfzell to Lindau in southern Germany.

== Railway lines ==
In its original meaning, the belt railway consists of the following sections in southern Germany, northwestern Austria and northeastern Switzerland:

- Konstanz–Radolfzell, part of the High Rhine Railway line (opened in 1863)
- Radolfzell–Stahringen, part of the Radolfzell–Mengen railway line (opened in 1867)
- Stahringen–Friedrichshafen railway line between Stahringen and Friedrichshafen Stadt (opened in 1895–1901)
- Friedrichshafen–Lindau railway line between Friedrichshafen Stadt and the junction near Lindau-Aeschach (opened in 1899)
- Lindau-Aeschach junction–Lindau-Insel, part of the Buchloe–Lindau railway line (opened in 1854)
- Lindau-Insel–Wolfurt-Lauterach Nord, part of the Lindau–Bludenz railway line (opened in 1872). This line crosses the Germany–Austria border
- St. Margrethen–Lauterach line between the Lauterach Nord junction (Wolfurt) and St. Margrethen (opened in 1873). This line crosses the Austria–Switzerland border
- St. Margrethen–Rorschach, part of the Chur–Rorschach railway line (opened in 1858)
- Rorschach–Konstanz, part of the Lake Line (opened in 1869–1871), which crosses the Switzerland–Germany border

The lines mostly run parallel to the lake shore. Only the Konstanz–Ludwigshafen (Bodensee), Uhldingen-Mühlhofen–Friedrichshafen-Fischbach and Bregenz–Staad sections run through the hinterland.

== Services ==
The lines are operated by S-Bahn services of Bodensee S-Bahn, which includes lines of Vorarlberg S-Bahn (ÖBB) and St. Gallen S-Bahn (SOB, Thurbo) and several regional train (RB) services (e.g. DB Regio, SWEG) in southern Germany.
