= Lindau-Aeschach station =

Railway station in Lindau, Germany

Lindau-Aeschach
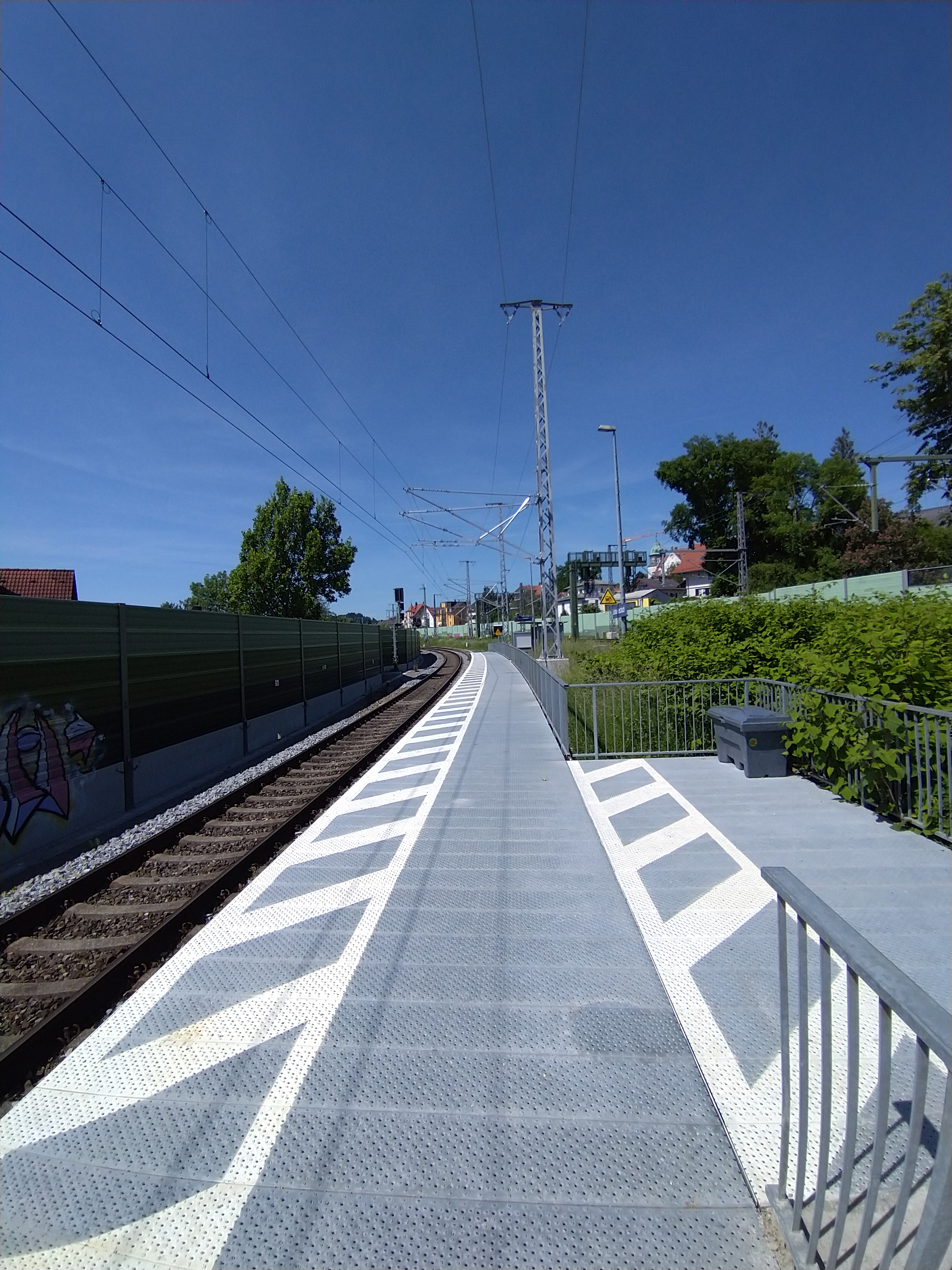
- 2022

General information
- Location: Wackerstraße; 88131 Lindau; Bavaria; Germany
- Coordinates: 47.55943°N 9.68472°E
- Elevation: 401 m (1,316 ft)
- System: Hp
- Owner: Deutsche Bahn
- Operator: DB Netz; DB Station&Service
- Lines: Friedrichshafen–Lindau railway (KBS 751)
- Platforms: 1 side platform
- Tracks: 3
- Train operators: DB Regio Baden-Württemberg
- Connections: Stadtbus Lindau: 2, 4; Regionalbus: 192

Construction
- Parking: no
- Cycle facilities: no
- Accessible: no

Other information
- Station code: 3728
- DS100 code: MLIA
- IBNR: 8003692
- Category: 6
- Website: www.bahnhof.de

Services
Preceding station	DB Regio Baden-Württemberg	Following station
Enzisweiler One-way operation	RE 3 Limited service	Lindau-Reutin Terminus
Enzisweiler towards Stuttgart Hbf	RE 5 Limited service	Lindau-Reutin Terminus
Enzisweiler towards Friedrichshafen Hafen	RB 93	Lindau-Insel Terminus
Location
- Location within Bavaria Location within Germany Location within Europe

Lindau-Aeschach station (German: Haltepunkt Lindau-Aeschach) is a railway station in the Aeschach district in the town of Lindau, located in Bavaria, Germany.
