= Friedrichshafen–Lindau railway =

Railway line in Baden-Württemberg and Bavaria, Germany

Friedrichshafen Stadt–Lindau-Aeschach Abzw

Overview
- Line number: 4530
- Locale: Baden-Württemberg and Bavaria, Germany
- Termini: Friedrichshafen Stadt; Lindau-Aeschach Abzw

Service
- Route number: 751

Technical
- Line length: 22.575 km (14.027 mi)
- Track gauge: 1,435 mm (4 ft 8 1/2 in) standard gauge
- Electrification: 15 kV/16.7 Hz AC overhead catenary
- Operating speed: 120 km/h (75 mph)

The Friedrichshafen–Lindau railway is a single-track main-line railway in Southern Germany, that has been electrified since December 2021. It connects the rail junction of Friedrichshafen Stadt in Baden-Württemberg with Lindau in Bavaria, where it meets the Buchloe–Lindau railway at a junction in the district of Aeschach. The 22.575 kilometre-long line runs consistently on the north shore of Lake Constance (Bodensee), with the western part lying in Bodenseekreis and the eastern part in the district of Lindau. The line is part of the route known as the Bodenseegürtelbahn (Lake Constance Belt Railway), connecting Radolfzell and Lindau-Insel.

== History ==
Friedrichshafen was connected to the rail network via the Württemberg Southern Railway (Württembergische Südbahn) in 1847 and Lindau was connected via the Ludwig South-North Railway (Ludwig-Süd-Nord-Bahn) in 1853, but the gap between the two towns was not closed by the Royal Württemberg State Railways and the Royal Bavarian State Railways until 1 October 1899. The entrance buildings at the Bavarian end of the line were built in the architectural style of the Württemberg railways. A 78-metre-long steel bridge was built over the Argen between Langenargen and Kressbronn by Maschinenfabrik Esslingen and has been placed under monument protection. It was replaced by a new steel bridge in 2019 in preparation for the electrification of the line.

A new platform was built at Nonnenhorn station and the main platform was modernised in 2021.

== Operations ==
The whole line has been integrated into the Bodensee-Oberschwaben Verkehrsverbund (Bodensee-Oberschwaben Transport Association, branded bodo) since 1 January 2018 and is mainly served by local passenger services, usually running twice an hour in each direction. The RB 93 Regionalbahn service usually stops at all stations, while the RE 5 Regional-Express service usually stops only in Kressbronn and Wasserburg (Bodensee) or Langenargen and Nonnenhorn. In addition, the Railjet train pair, Bregenzerwald, between Vienna Airport and Frankfurt (Main) Hauptbahnhof and the Intercity train pair, Bodensee, between Dortmund and Innsbruck run on the line without stopping between Friedrichshafen Stadt and Lindau-Reutin.

One to two pairs of freight trains run daily, pulled by a class 232 or a class 247 locomotive.

The line is equipped with the GSM-R communications system and the Geschwindigkeitsüberwachung Neigetechnik (ZUB 262) train control system.

== Gallery ==
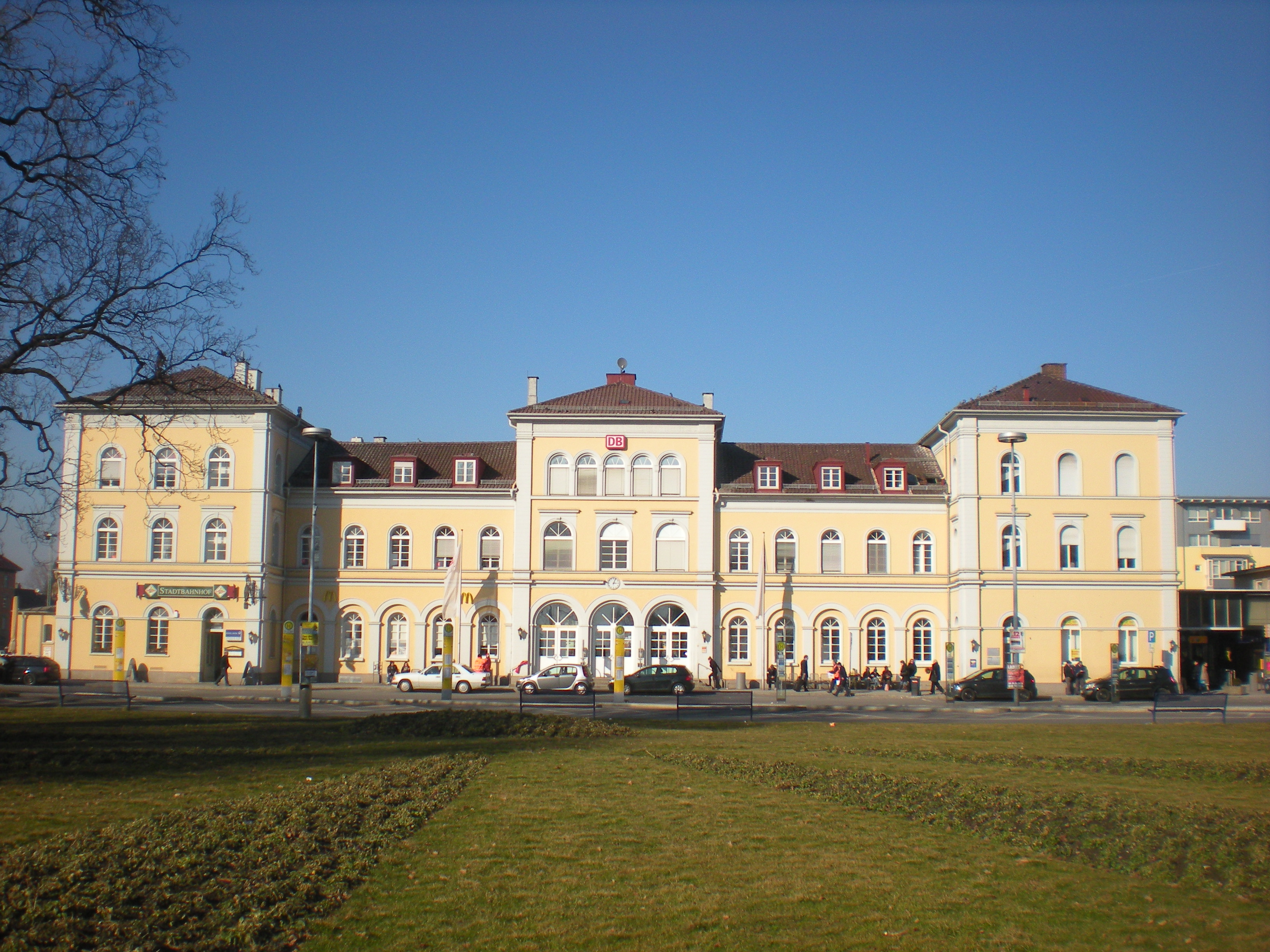
Friedrichshafen Stadt station

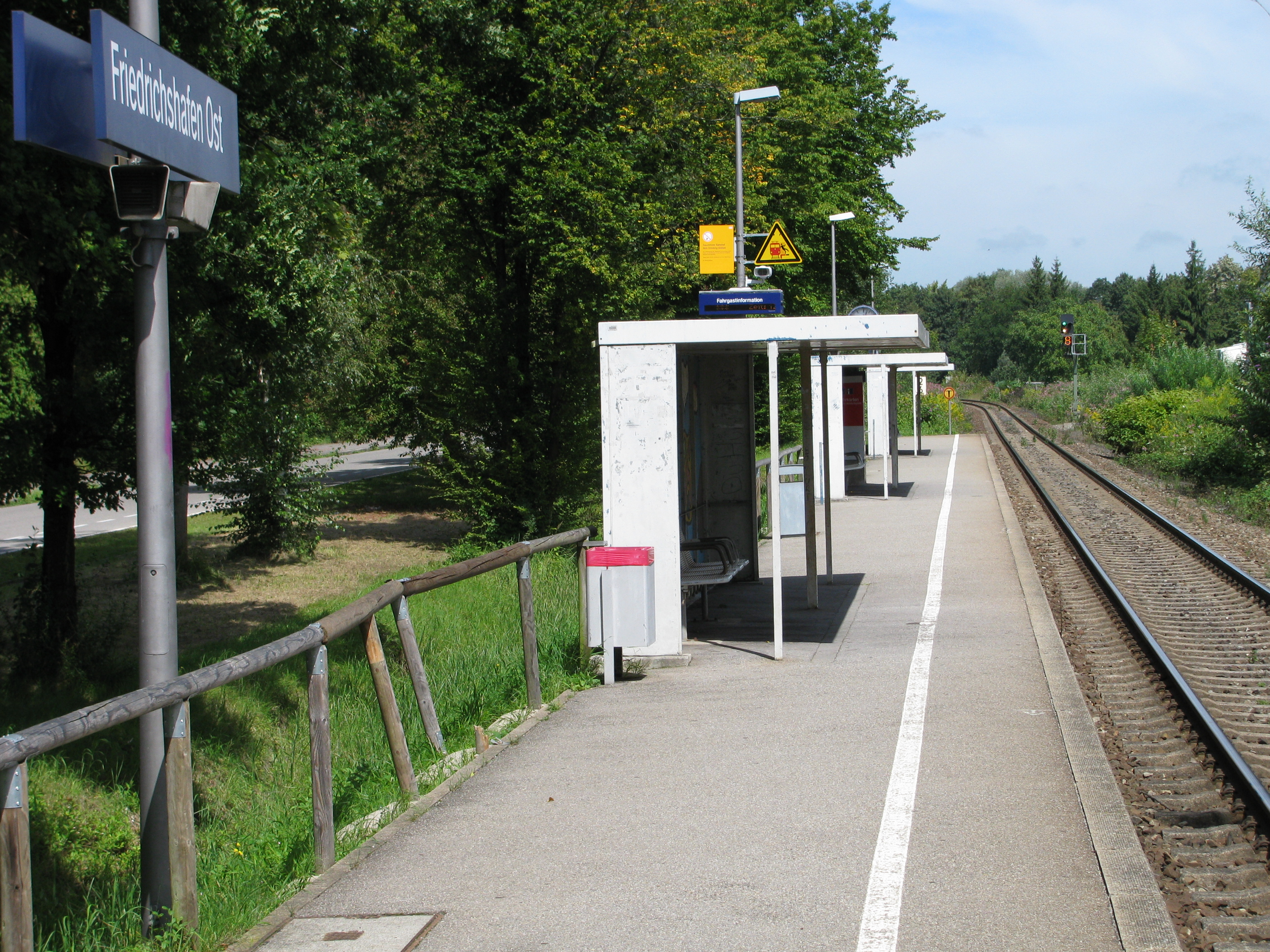
Friedrichshafen Ost station

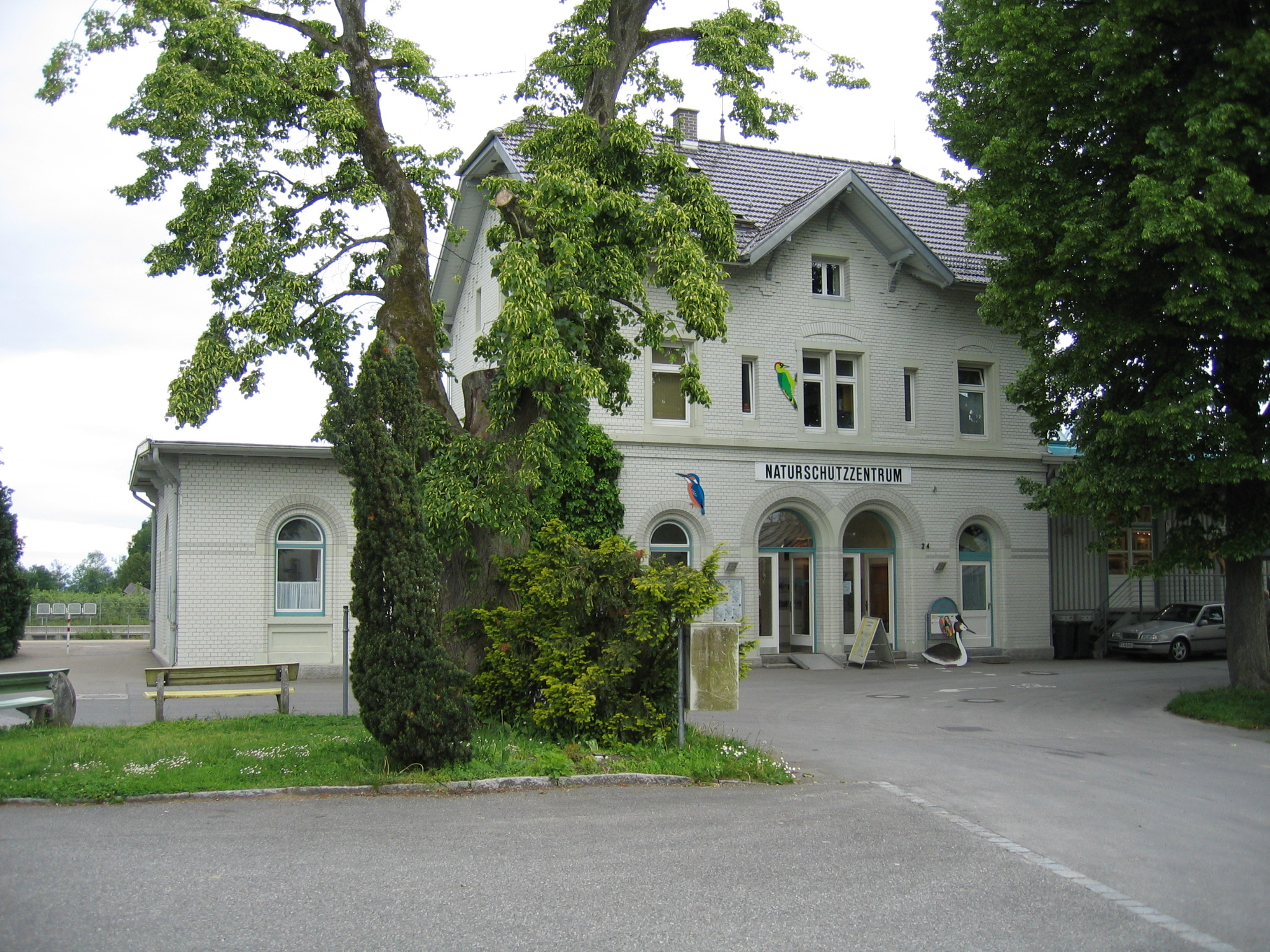
Eriskirch station

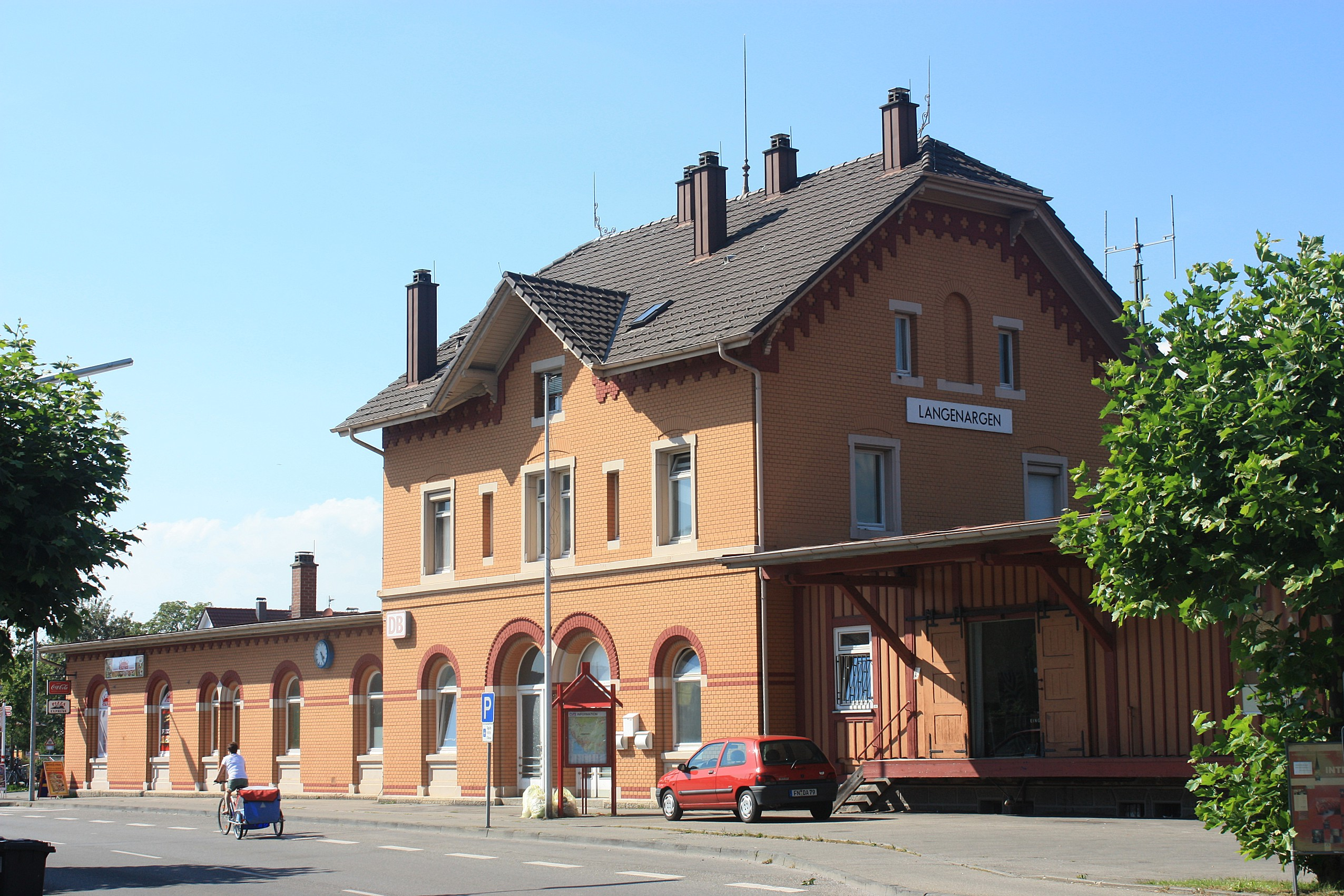
Langenargen station

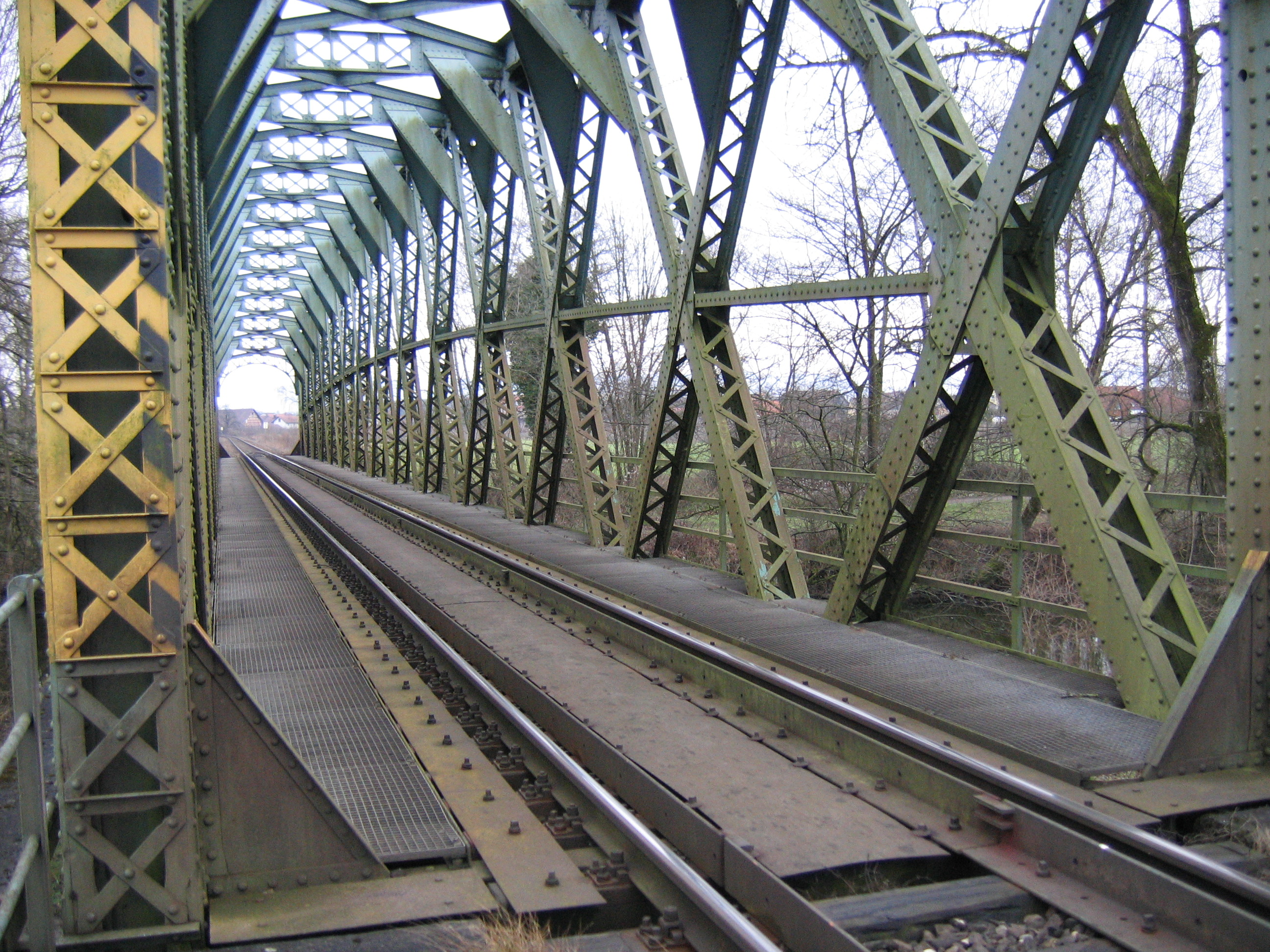
Bridge over the Argen (2005)

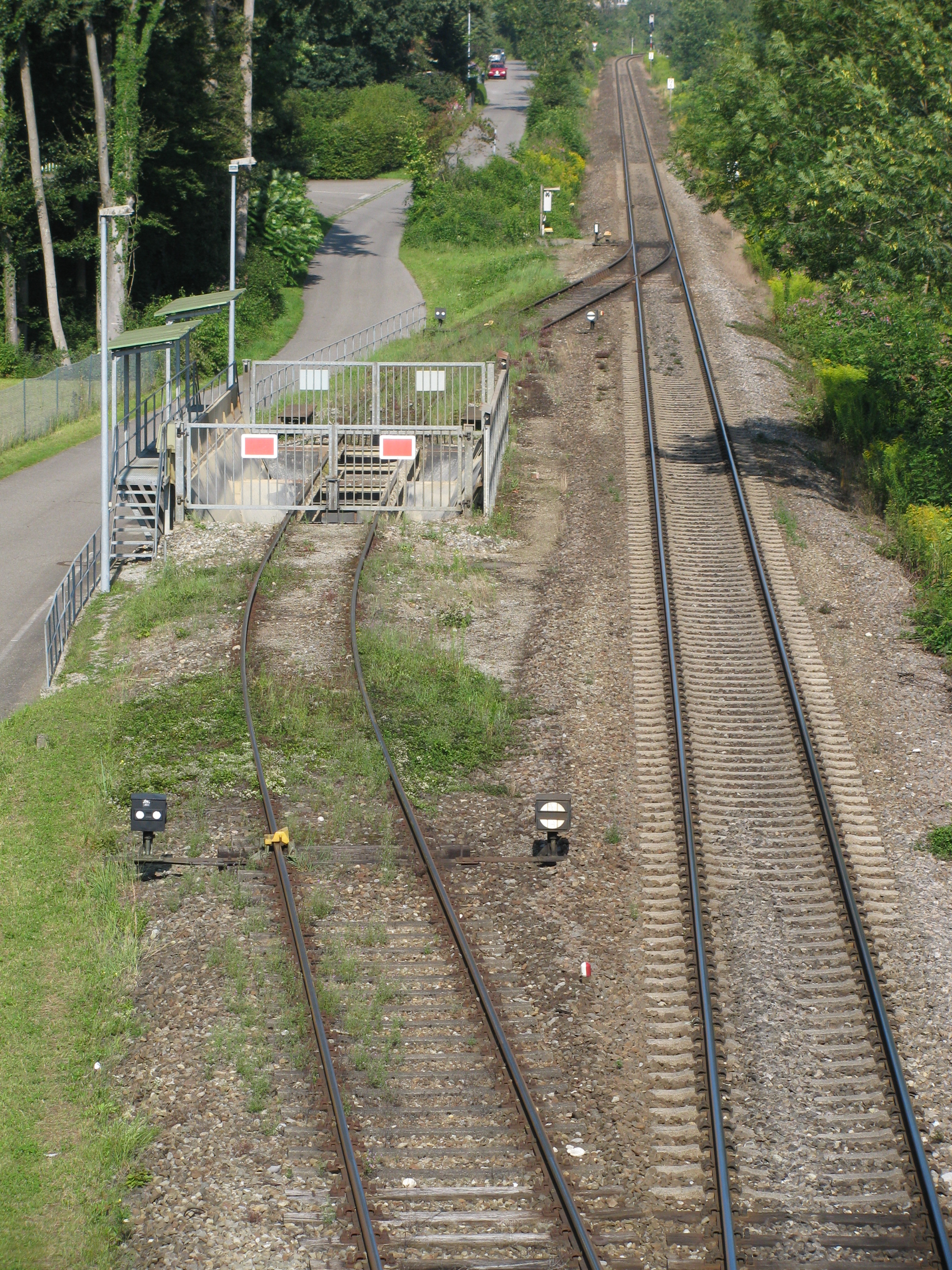
Siding of Marschall gravel works in Kressbronn

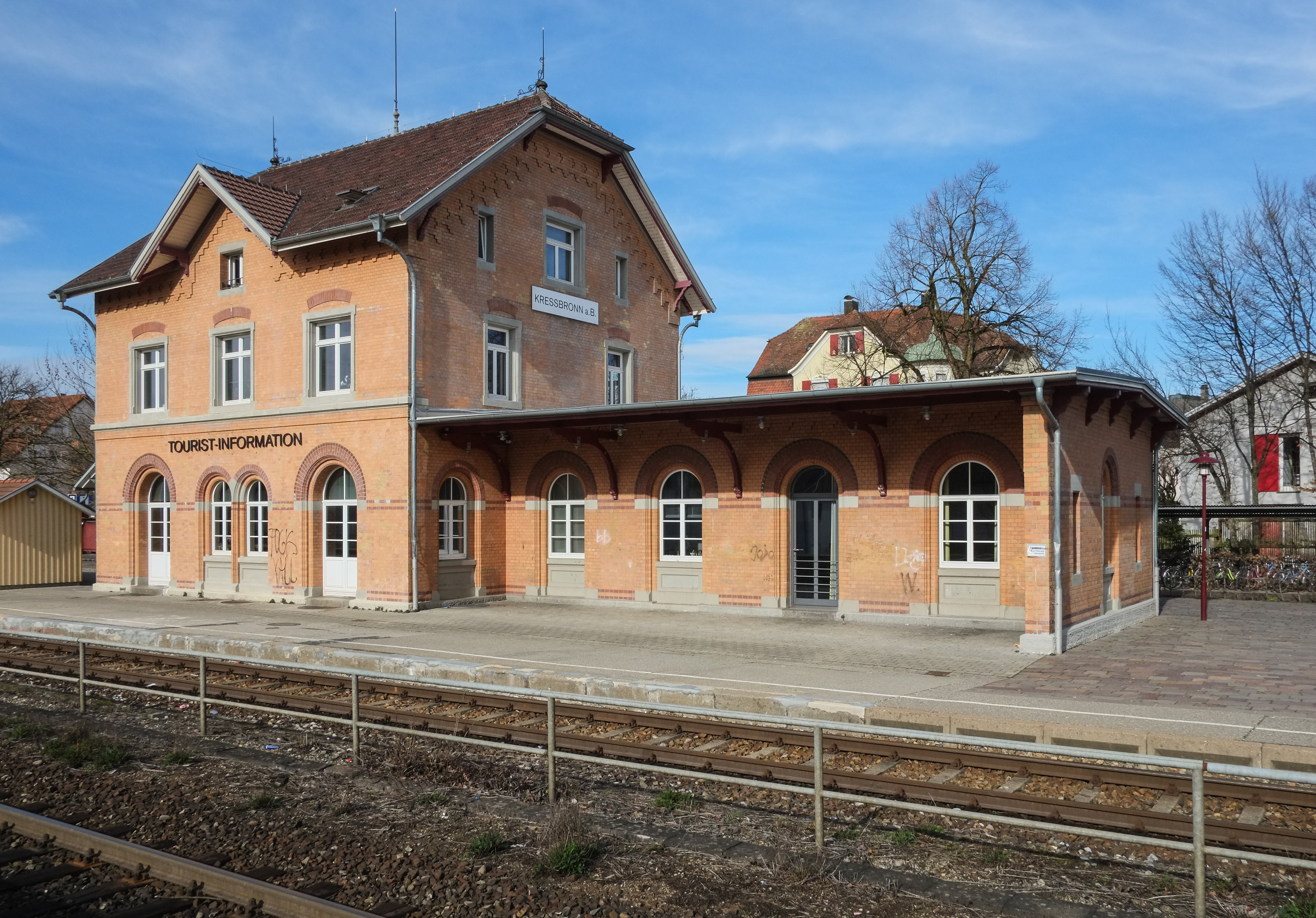
Kressbronn station

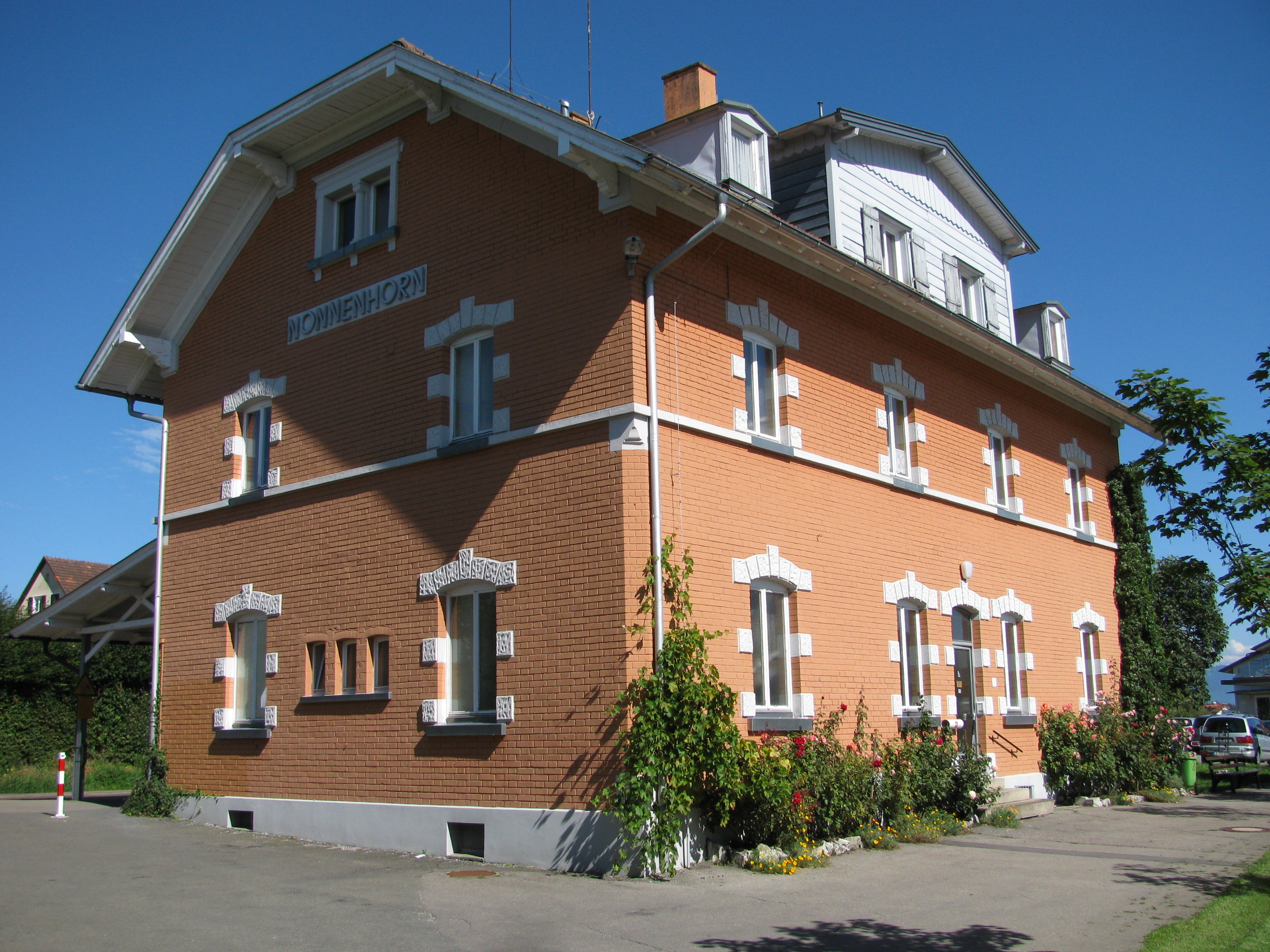
Nonnenhorn station

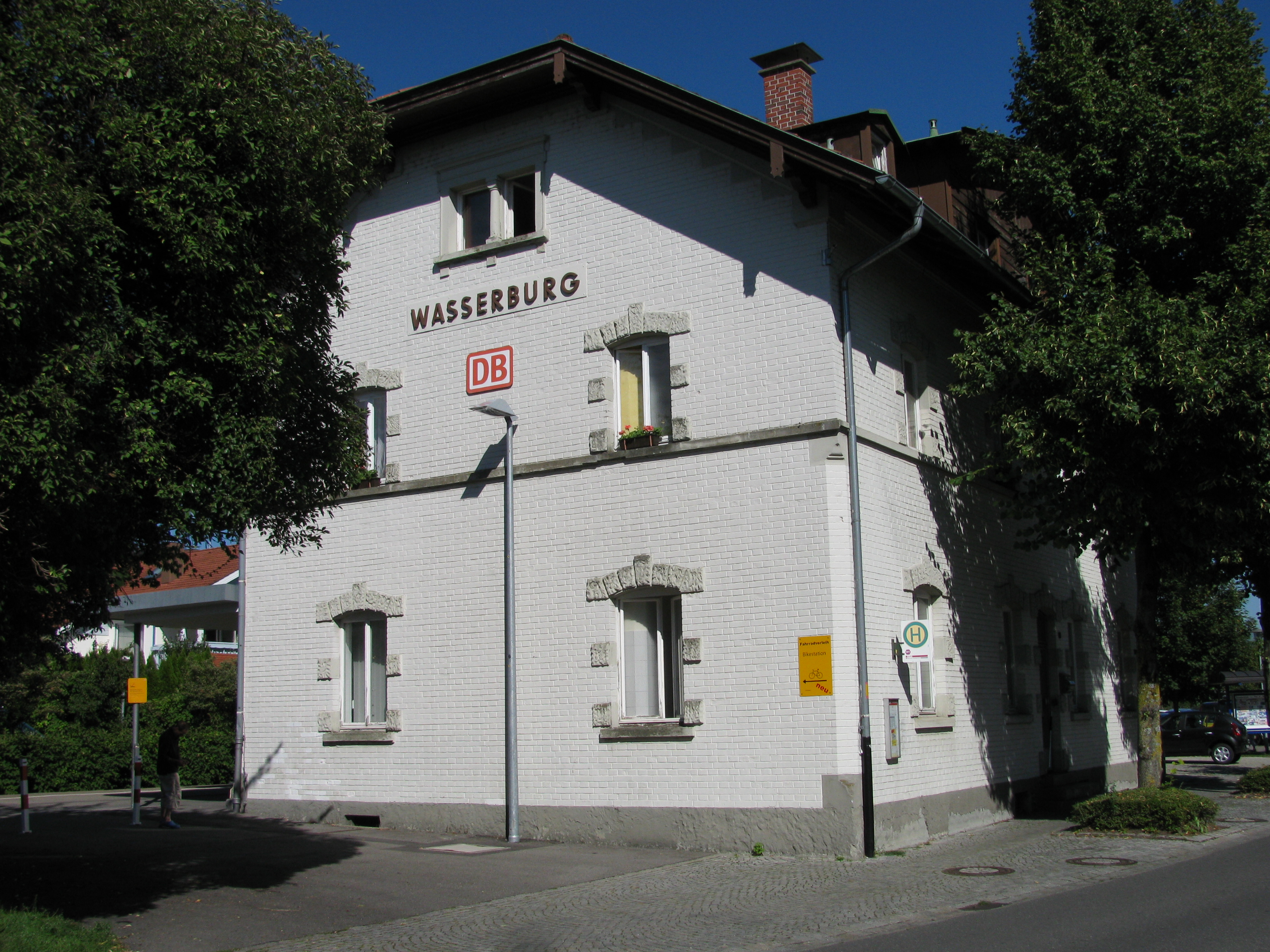
Wasserburg station

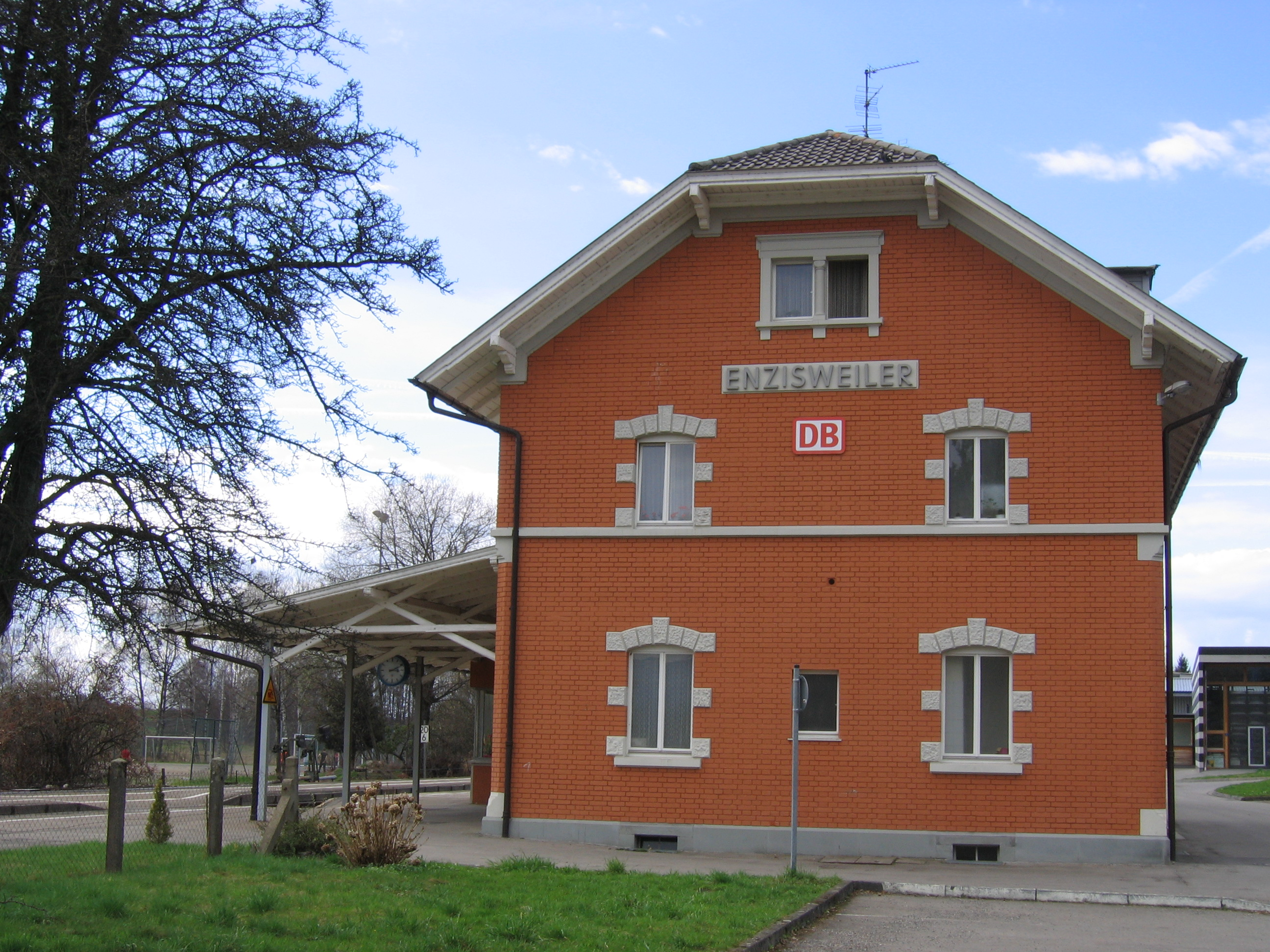
Enzisweiler station

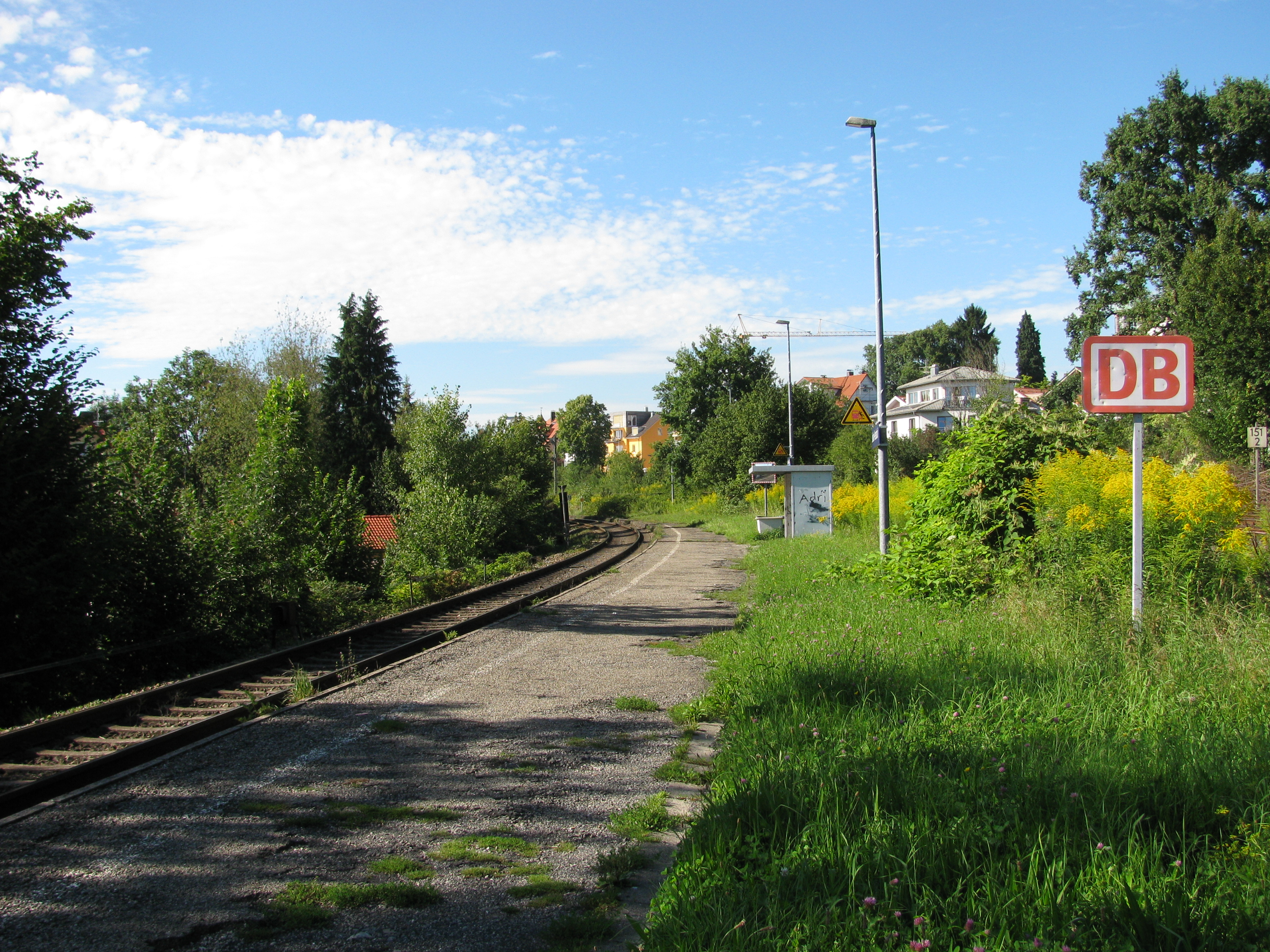
Lindau-Aeschach station

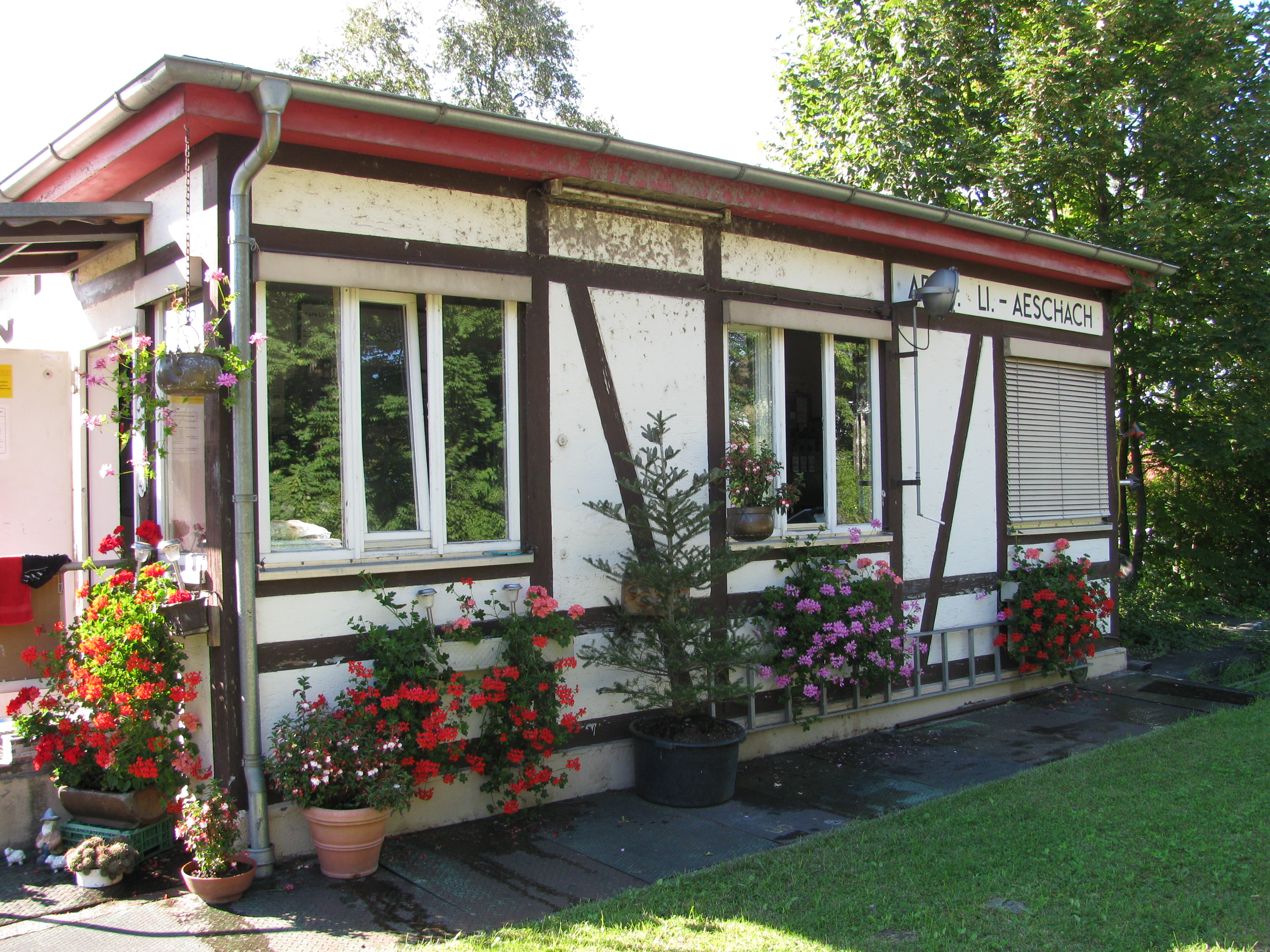
Signal box at Lindau-Aeschach junction
