= Friedrichshafen Stadt station =

Railway station in Friedrichshafen, Germany

Friedrichshafen Stadt
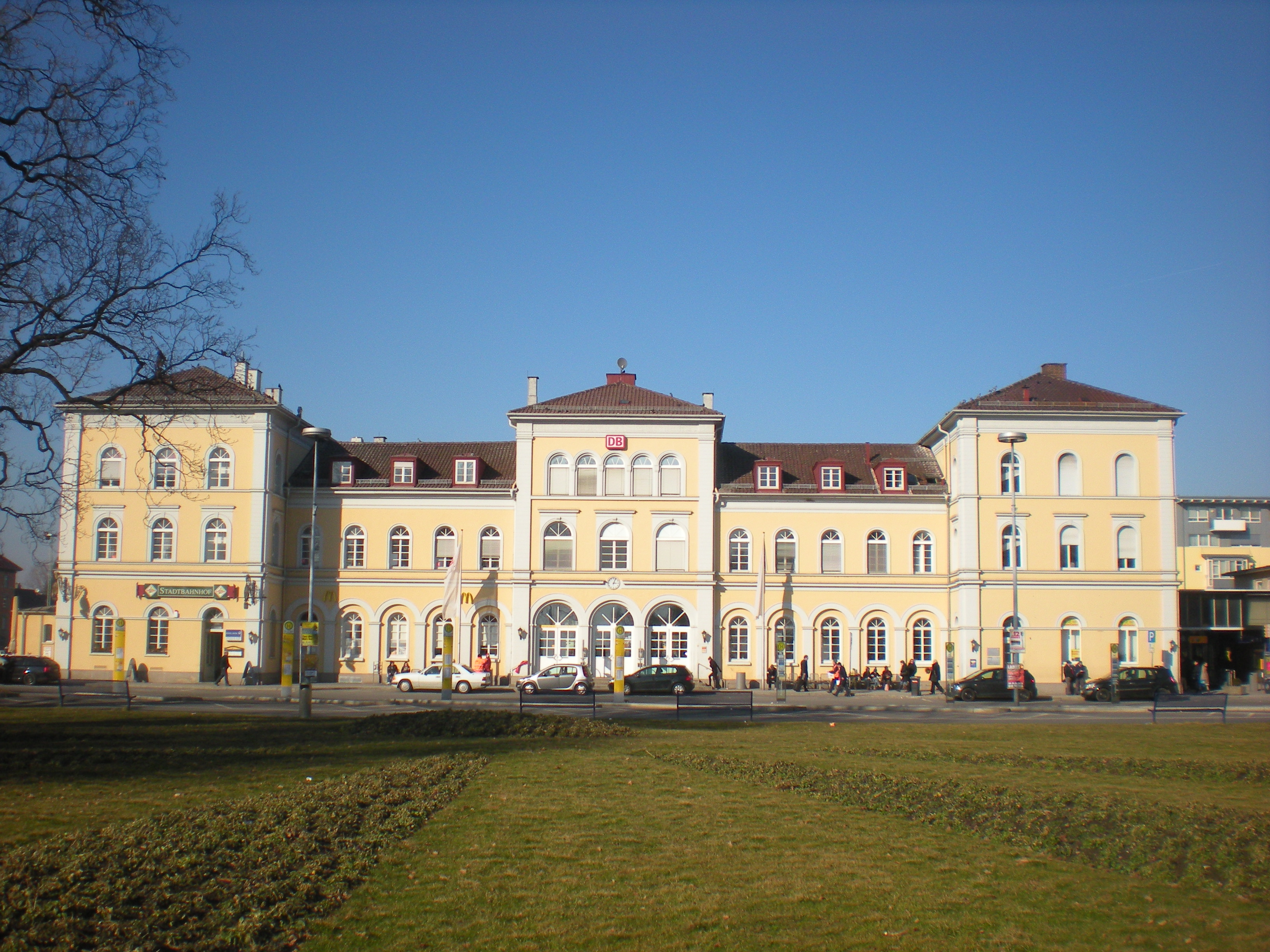

General information
- Location: Stadtbahnhof 1, Friedrichshafen, Baden-Württemberg; Germany
- Coordinates: 47°39′12″N 9°28′24″E
- Elevation: 404 m (1,325 ft)
- Owner: DB Netz
- Operator: DB Station&Service
- Lines: Ulm–Friedrichshafen (KBS 751); Friedrichshafen Stadt–Friedrichshafen Hafen (KBS 751); Friedrichshafen–Lindau (KBS 751); Stahringen–Friedrichshafen (KBS 731); Friedrichshafen–Oberteuringen (closed)
- Platforms: 5

Construction
- Accessible: Yes
- Architect: Ludwig Friedrich Gaab

Other information
- Station code: 1947
- DS100 code: TF
- IBNR: 8000112
- Category: 3
- Fare zone: bodo: 10
- Website: www.bahnhof.de

History
- Opened: 8 November 1847
Services
Preceding station	DB Fernverkehr	Following station
Ravensburg towards Dortmund Hbf	ICE 62 Bodensee	Lindau-Reutin towards Innsbruck Hbf
Preceding station	DB Regio Baden-Württemberg	Following station
Reverses direction	RE 3 Ulm – Lindau-Reutin	Ravensburg towards Ulm Hbf
Reverses direction	RE 3 Ulm – Lindau-Reutin	Langenargen towards Lindau-Reutin
Salem towards Basel Bad Bf	RE 3 Basel – Friedrichshafen Hafen	Friedrichshafen Hafen Terminus
Meckenbeuren towards Stuttgart Hbf	RE 5	Meckenbeuren towards Lindau-Reutin
Friedrichshafen Landratsamt towards Singen (Hohentwiel)	RB 31	Friedrichshafen Hafen Terminus
Friedrichshafen Landratsamt towards Singen (Hohentwiel)	RB 31	Friedrichshafen Ost towards Kressbronn
Terminus	RB 93	Friedrichshafen Ost towards Lindau-Insel
Preceding station	Bodensee-Oberschwaben-Bahn	Following station
Reverses direction	RB 91	Löwental towards Aulendorf
Reverses direction	RB 91	Friedrichshafen Hafen Terminus
Preceding station	SVG Stuttgart	Following station
Salem towards Singen (Hohentwiel)	FEX Limited service	Aulendorf towards Stuttgart Hbf
Location
- Location within Germany Location within Baden-Württemberg

Friedrichshafen Stadt (city) station is the largest railway station of the city of Friedrichshafen on Lake Constance (Bodensee) and a railway junction in the German state of Baden-Württemberg. It has five tracks and is classified by Deutsche Bahn as a category 3 station. Each day it is used by about 160 trains operated by Deutsche Bahn and the Bodensee-Oberschwaben-Bahn (BOB). Ulm–Friedrichshafen railway from Ulm ends at the station, where it meets the Stahringen–Friedrichshafen railway and the Friedrichshafen–Lindau railway. Another major railway station in the city, Friedrichshafen Hafen station (Friedrichshafen port station), which is operated as part of Friedrichshafen Stadt station, was used until 1976 for loading and unloading carriages on the Lake Constance train ferry to Romanshorn in Switzerland.

== Location ==
Friedrichshafen Stadt station is located in the northwest of the city of Friedrichshafen. The station building is south of the tracks and its address is Stadtbahnhof 1. South of the station building, Bahnhofplatz (station place) extends from the bus station to Friedrichstraße, which links the station to the city centre. On the south side of Friedrichstrasse is the town park, which runs along the banks of Lake Constance, which is about 200 metres from the station. North of the station are Eugenstraße and Franziskusplatz. Local highway K7739 (here called Riedleparkstraße), runs through a tunnel under the tracks to the east of the station. Olgastraße crosses the tracks over a level crossing to the west of the station.

== History ==
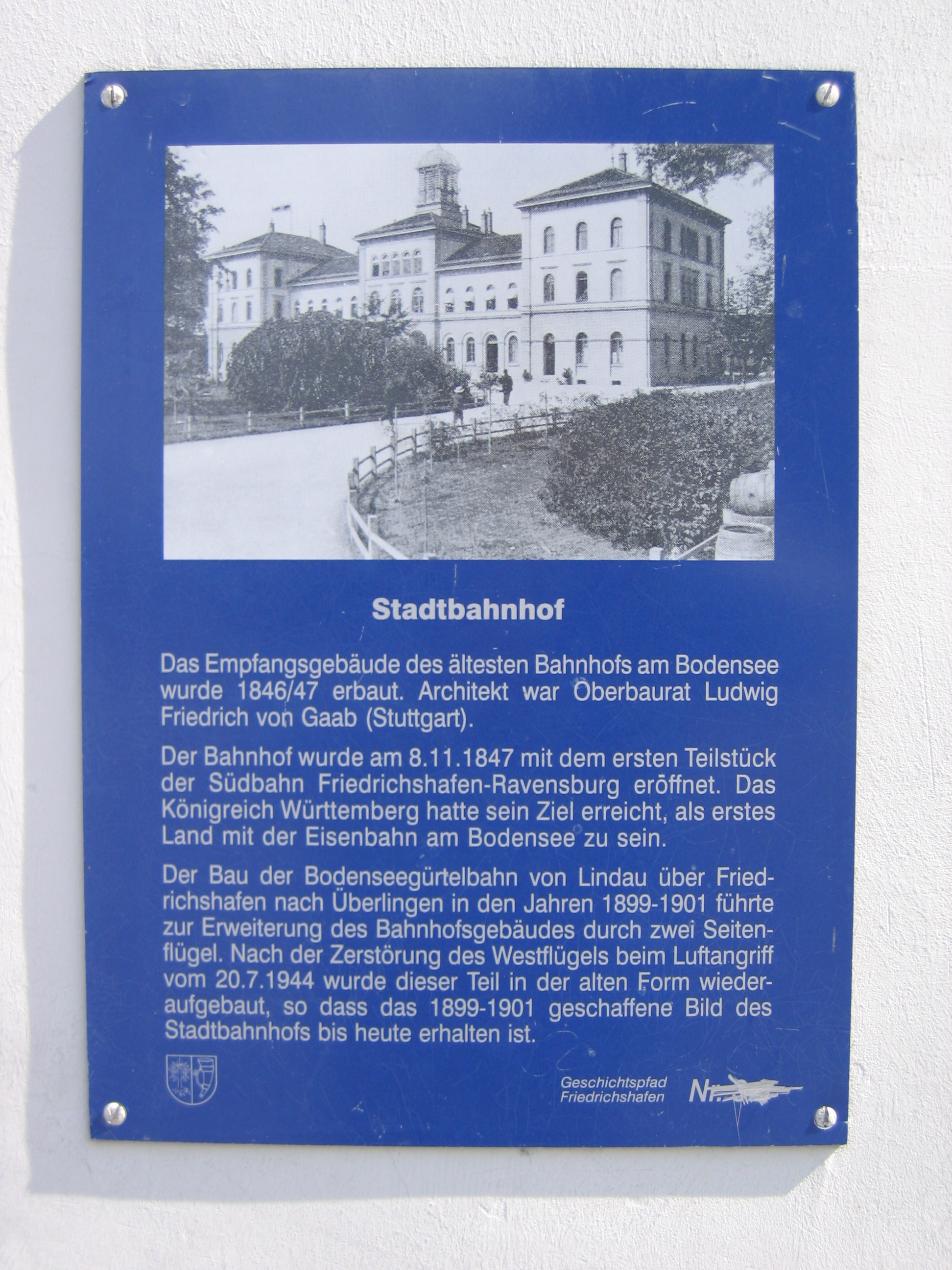
Information board of Friedrichshafen Stadt station

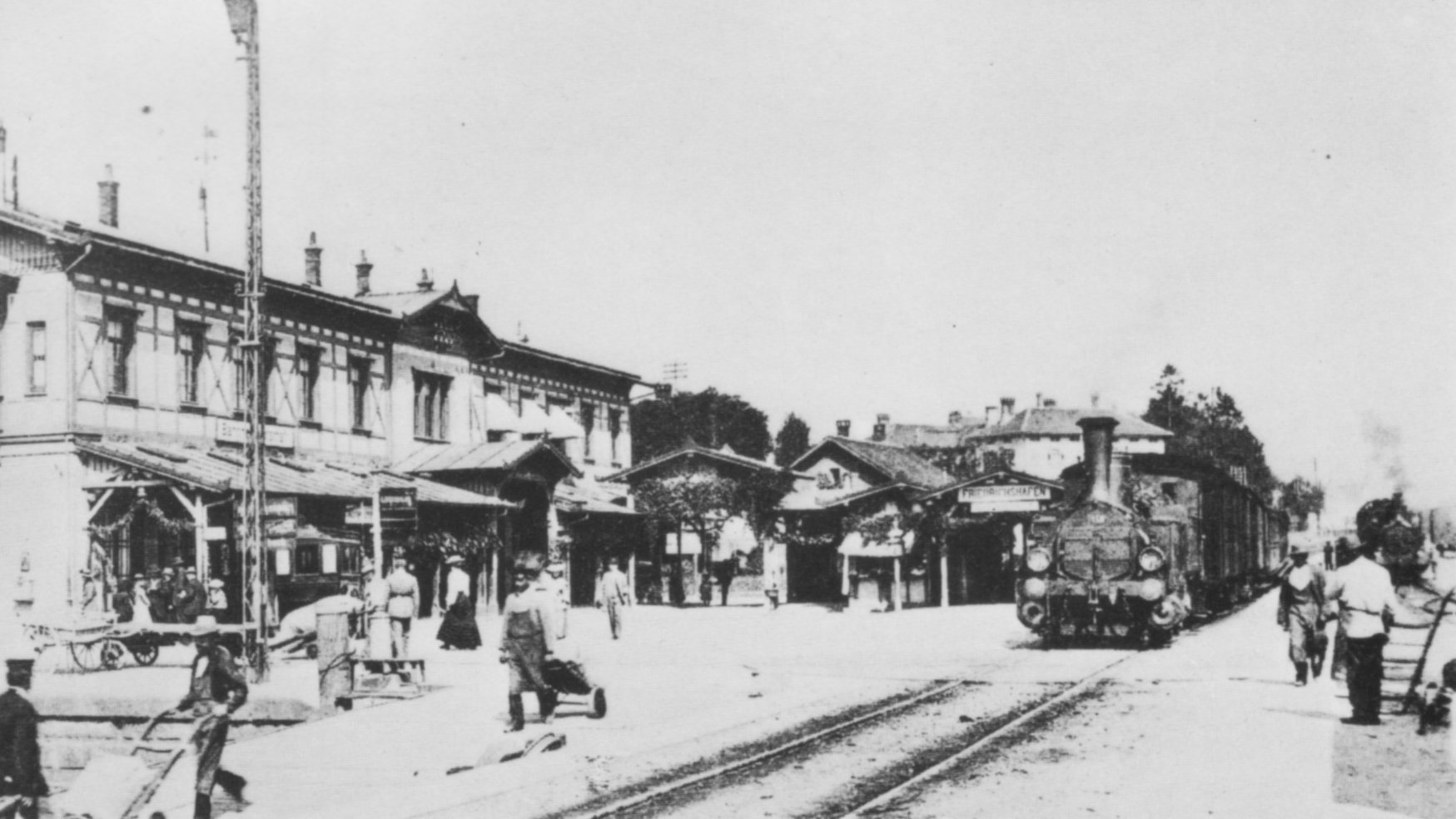
Old Friedrichshafen port station with locomotive T2aa "Stuifen"

Friedrichshafen Stadt station was dedicated on 8 November 1847 as the first station on Lake Constance with the opening of the first section of the Württemberg Southern Railway from Ravensburg to Friedrichshafen. This meant that the Kingdom of Württemberg had achieved its goal of completing the first railway to Lake Constance ahead of Bavaria and Baden. The station building was built between 1846 and 1848 by the architect Ludwig Friedrich von Gaab. On 26 May 1849, the Southern Railway was extended to Biberach an der Riss and on 1 June 1850 to Ulm. With the completion of Fils Valley Railway from Ulm to Stuttgart on 29 June 1850, Friedrichshafen and the Southern Railway were connected to the rest of the Württemberg railway network, allowing a continuous service from Heilbronn to Friedrichshafen. On 1 October 1899, the first piece of the Bodenseegürtel Railway (Lake Constance Belt Railway) was opened from Lindau to Friedrichshafen Stadt and opened and on 2 October 1901 the line was continued from Friedrichshafen to Überlingen, which had been connected since 1895 to Singen via Radolfzell. Two wings were added to the station building for the Bodenseegürtel Railway, which connected Bavaria, Württemberg and Baden. The Southern Railway was duplicated from 1905 to 1913. On 2 June 1922, the Württembergische Nebenbahnen AG (Württemberg Secondary Railways Company) commenced operations on the Teuringen Valley Railway (Teuringertal-Bahn) to Oberteuringen. Already in May 1923 it had to close its operations for financial reasons, before they could be restarted in 1924 by the Teuringertal-Bahn GmbH. In the Second World War the west wing was destroyed in an air raid on 20 July 1944; it was rebuilt after the war in its original form. Passenger services on the Teuringen Valley Railway were closed on 23 May 1954 and freight traffic ended on 15 February 1960. The section from Friedrichshafen Stadt to the former Friedrichshafen-Zahnradfabrik station continues to operate as a siding.

The lines from Ulm and Lindau have been electrified since December 2021.

== Rail operations ==
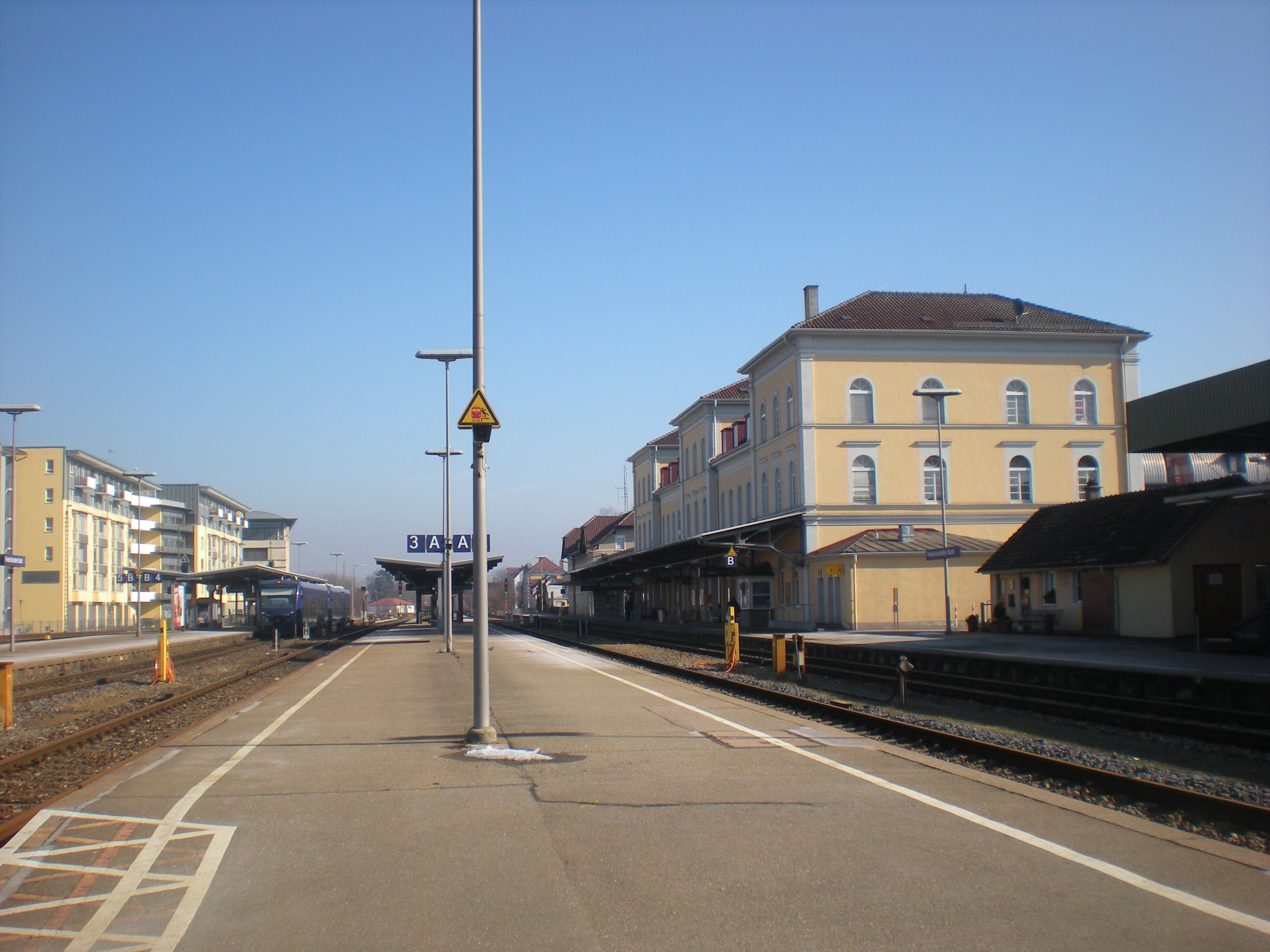
Platforms and track side of the station building

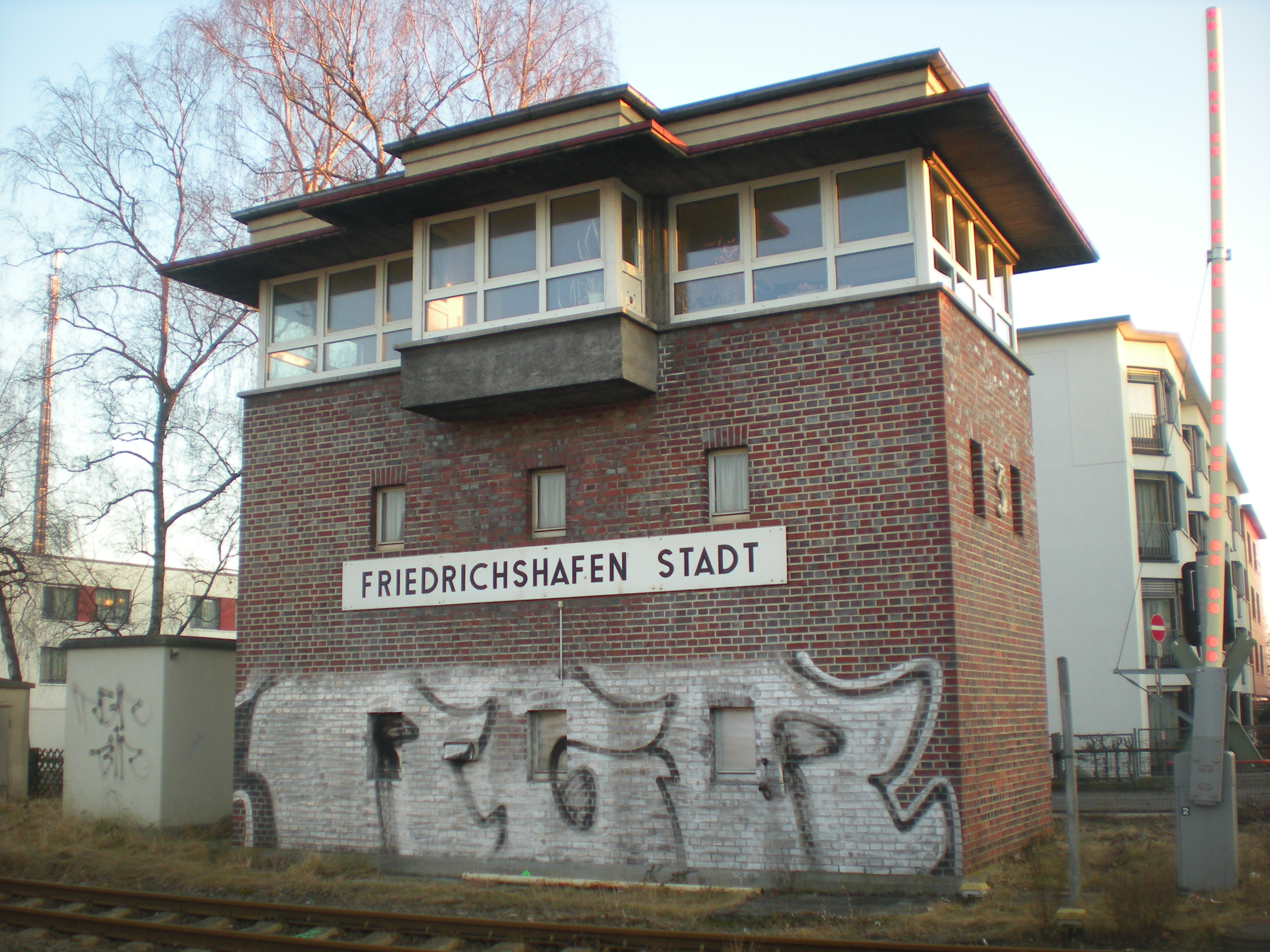
Electromechanical signal box to the west of the platforms

Until 28 November 2004, signals and switches at the station were controlled by three electro-mechanical signal boxes of a class introduced by Siemens & Halske in 1912, which became operational in 1930, 1947 and 1953. Since 28 November 2004, the station has been controlled by an electronic interlocking built by Lorenz.

=== Platform information ===
Friedrichshafen Stadt station has five platform tracks on three platforms, with track 1 next to the station building. All platforms are covered and have digital platform displays. The island platforms are connected to the main platform and Franziskusplatz via an underpass. To ensure accessibility, there are lifts on track 1 and on the platform of tracks 2 and 3 as well as a ramp at Franziskusplatz. A lift on the platform of tracks 4 and 5 is due for completion in 2024.

Platform track	Length in m	Height in cm	Use
1	250	54	RJX and IC services to Innsbruck, IRE to Ulm, RB to Radolfzell, Friedrichshafen Hafen and Aulendorf
2	352	54	RE and RB services to Lindau, Friedrichshafen Hafen and Aulendorf
3	352	54	RJX and IC services towards Ulm, IRE to Ulm, RB to Friedrichshafen Hafen
4	216	54	IRE services to Ulm, Basel and Lindau, RB to Friedrichshafen Hafen and Ravensburg
5	216	54	Some RB services to Friedrichshafen Hafen, Radolfzell, Lindau and Ravensburg

== Rail services ==
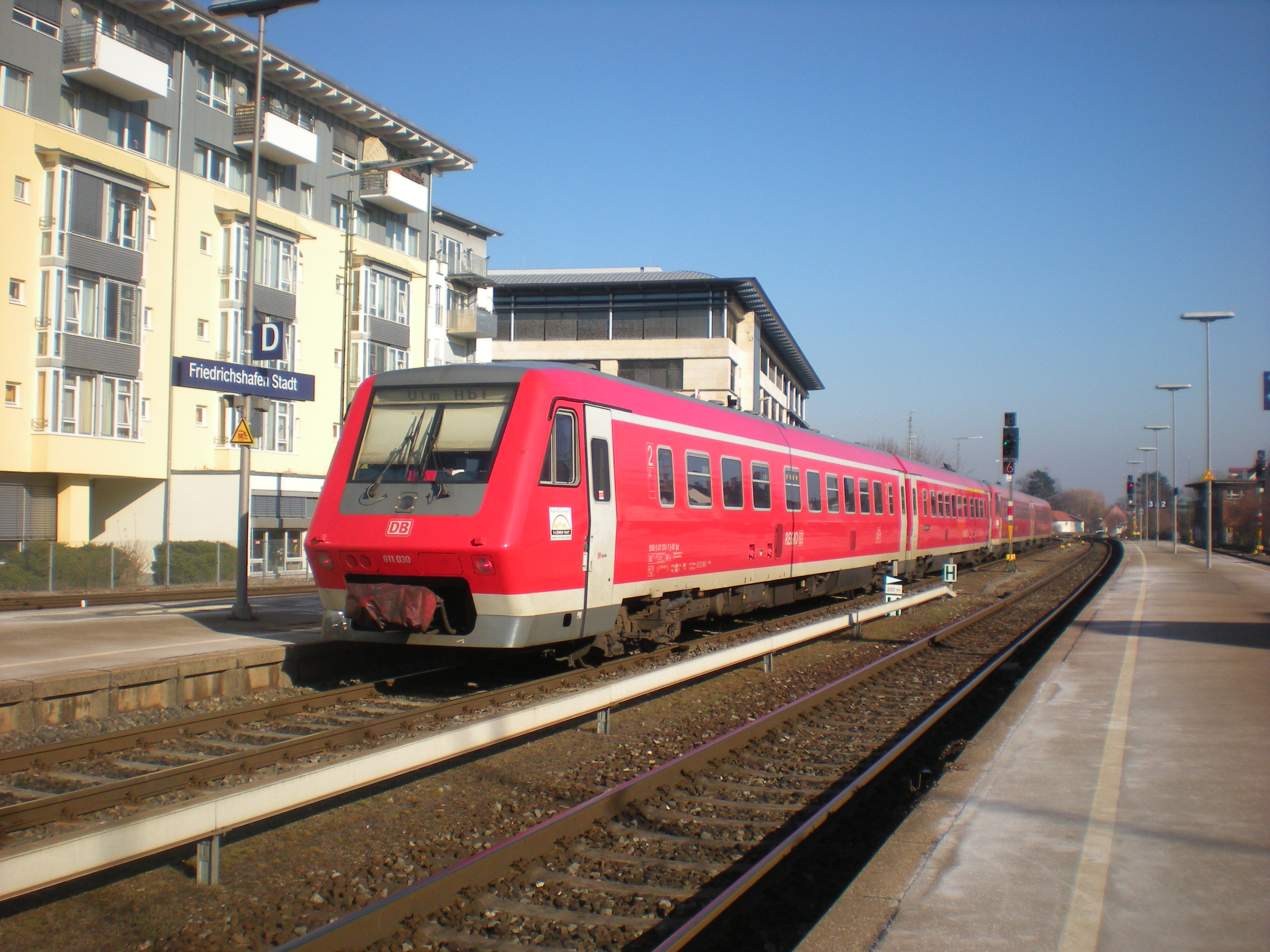
IRE service to Ulm with class 611

In the 2026 timetable, the following long-distance services stopped at the station:

Line/ service type	Route	Frequency
ICE 62	Dortmund – Essen – Duisburg – Düsseldorf – Köln Messe/Deutz – Frankfurt Airport – Mannheim – Heidelberg – Stuttgart – Ulm – Friedrichshafen Stadt – Lindau-Reutin – Bregenz – St. Anton – Innsbruck	1 train pair
RE 3	(Friedrichshafen Hafen –) Friedrichshafen Stadt – Singen (Hohentwiel) – Schaffhausen – Basel Bad Bf	Every 2 hours
RE 3	Ulm – Ravensburg – Friedrichshafen Stadt – Lindau-Reutin	Hourly
RE 5	Stuttgart – Plochingen – Ulm – Aulendorf – Ravensburg – Friedrichshafen Stadt (– Lindau-Reutin)	Hourly
RB 31	(Friedrichshafen Hafen –) Friedrichshafen Stadt – Überlingen – Radolfzell (– Singen (Hohentwiel))	Hourly
RB 91	Aulendorf – Ravensburg – Friedrichshafen Stadt – Friedrichshafen Hafen	Hourly
RB 93	Friedrichshafen Stadt – Lindau-Insel	Hourly
FEX	Stuttgart – Plochingen – Ulm – Aulendorf – Friedrichshafen Stadt – Singen (Hohentwiel)	Limited service

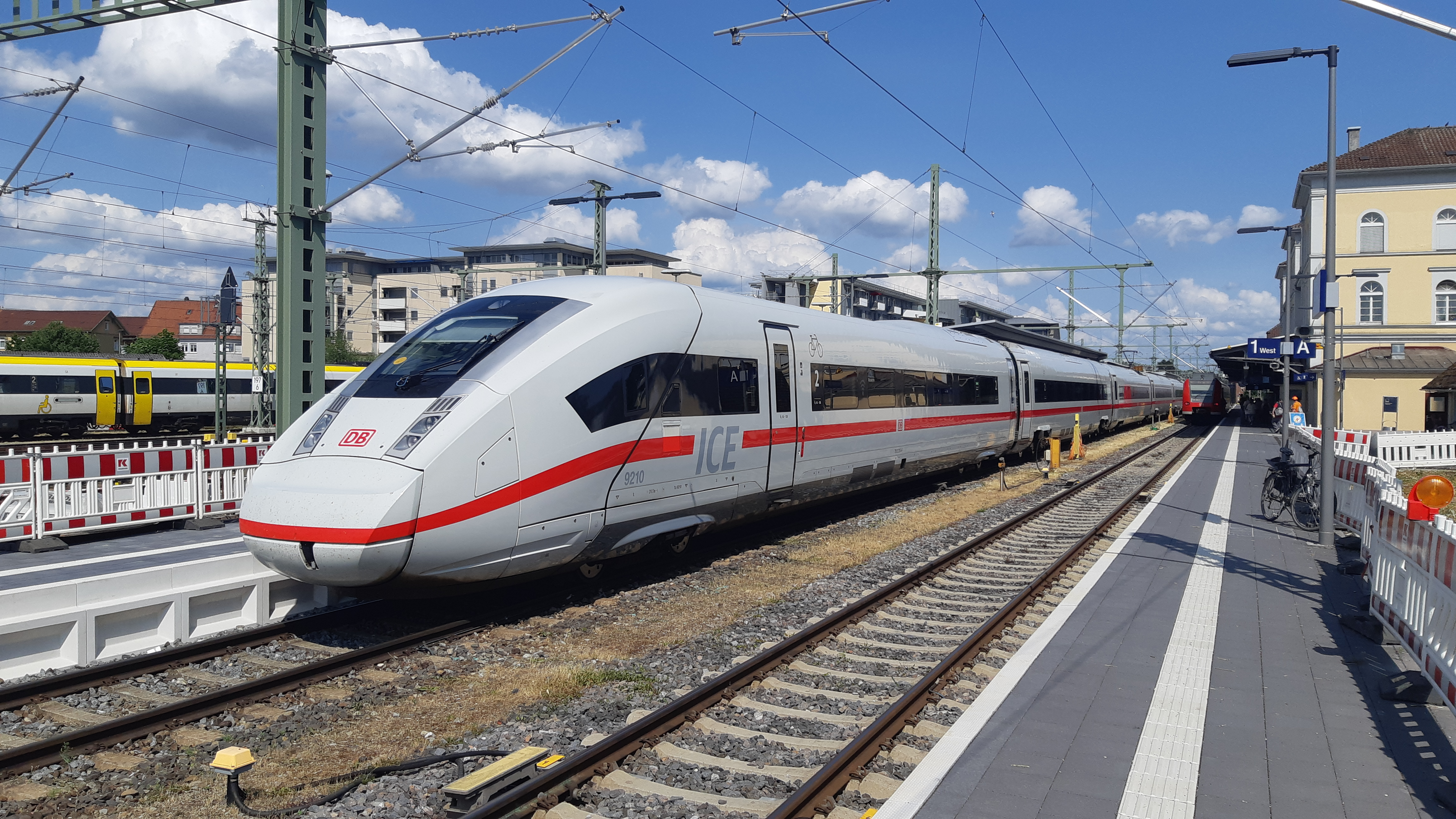
ICE 4 at Friedrichshafen Stadt station.

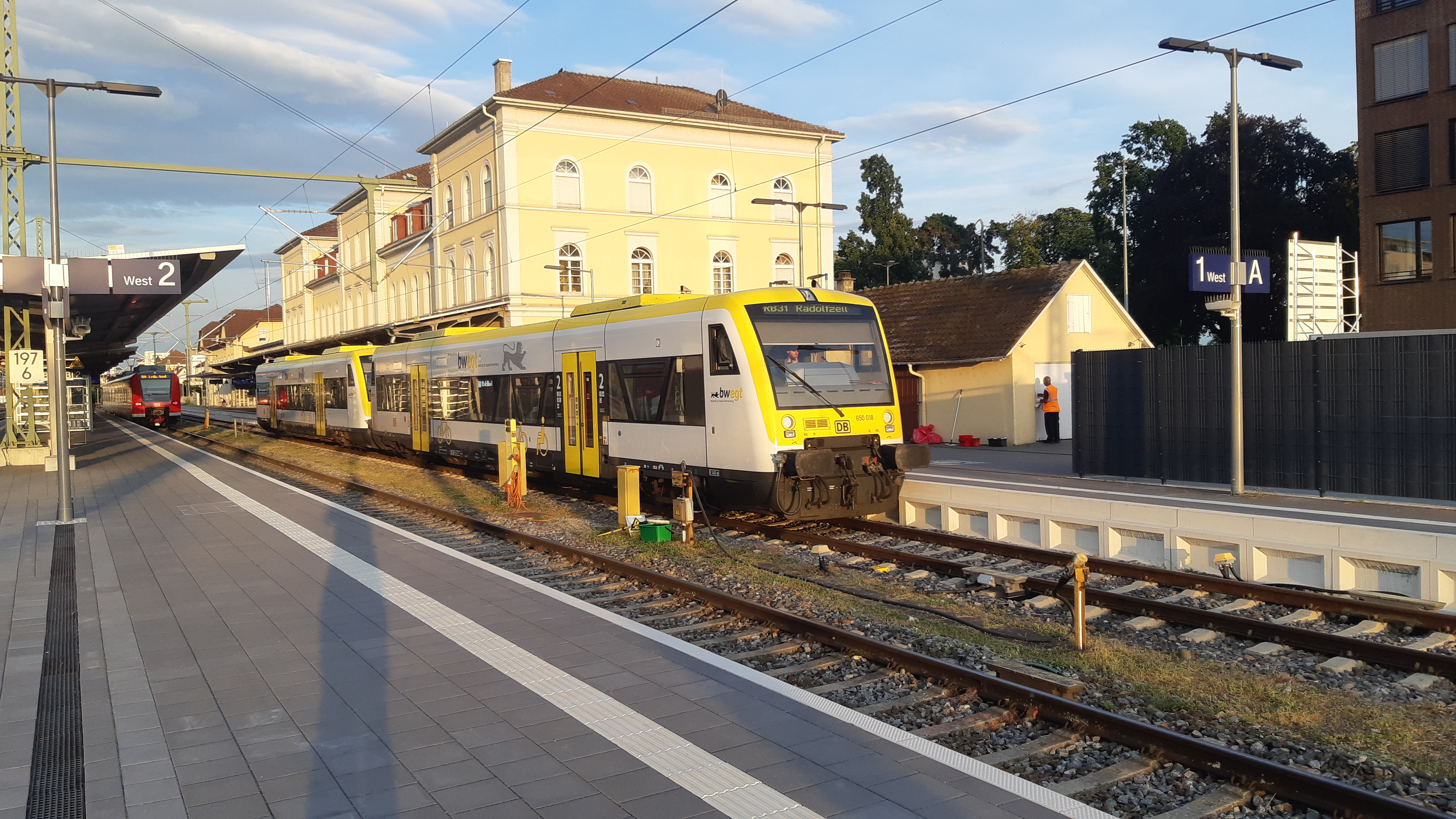
BR 650 as RB 31

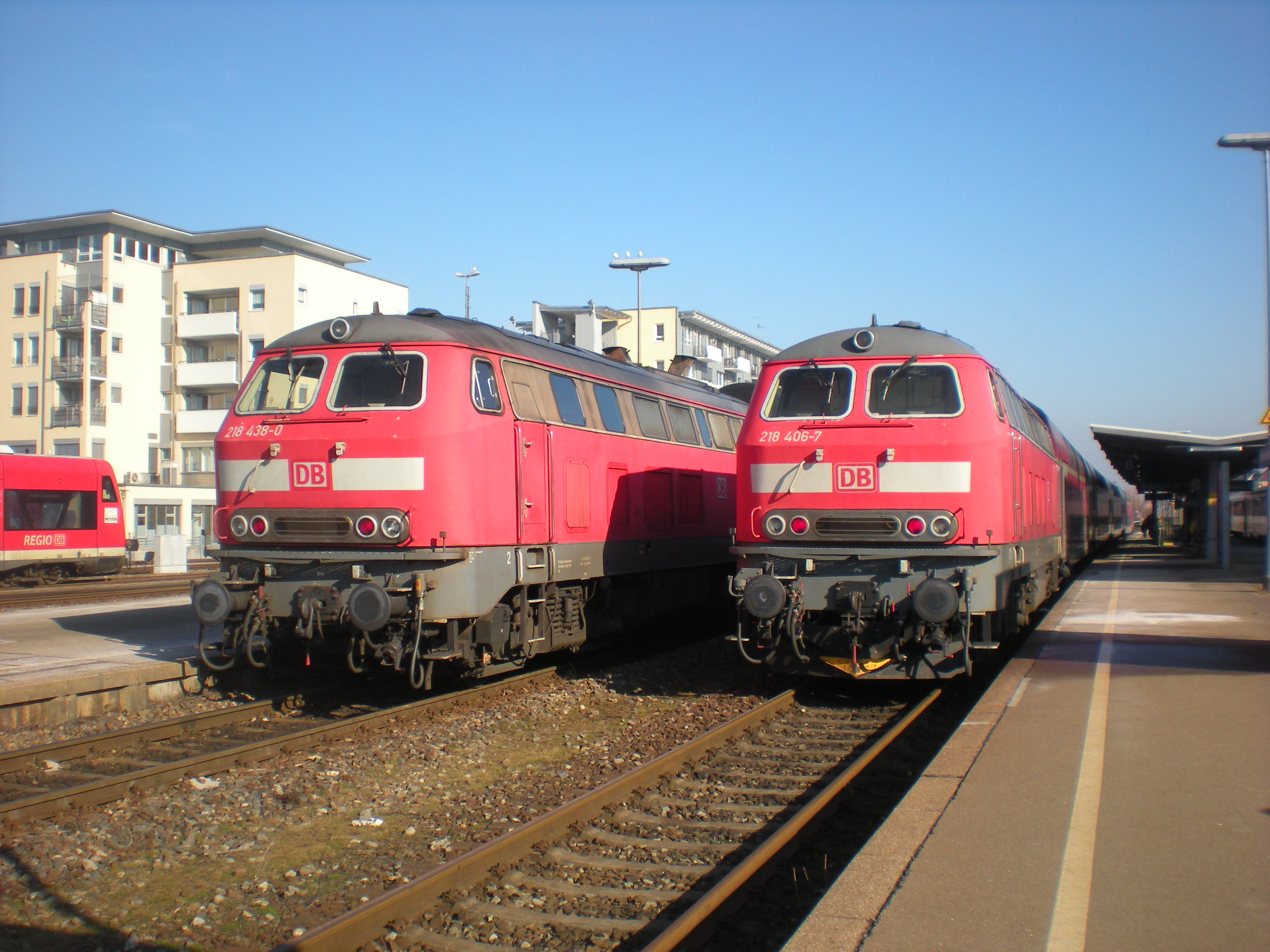
Two class 218 locomotives with IRE to Lindau and Ulm

== Other stations in Friedrichshafen ==
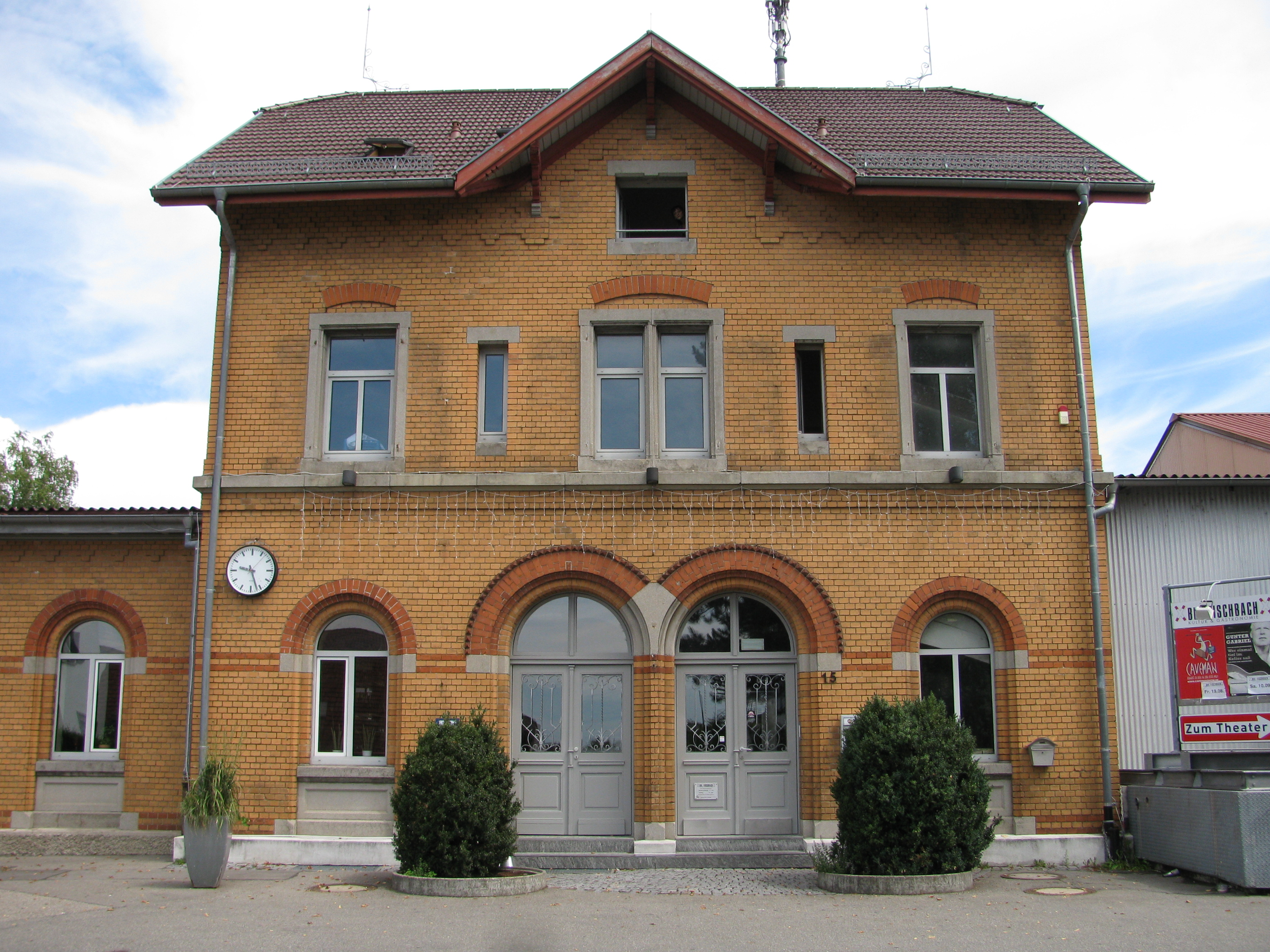
Friedrichshafen-Fischbach station

In addition to the Stadt and the Hafen stations, Friedrichshafen has the stations of Löwental and Flughafen Friedrichshafen on the Southern Railway, and the stations of Friedrichshafen Kluftern, Friedrichshafen-Fischbach, Friedrichshafen Landratsamt, Friedrichshafen Ost and Friedrichshafen Manzell station on the Bodenseegürtel Railway. There were also the stations of Seemoos and Friedrichshafen Strandbad, which were also on the Bodenseegürtel Railway and are now closed. On the now disused Teuringen Valley Railway there was the stations of Friedrichshafen-Zahnradfabrik, Friedrichshafen-Trautenmühle, Friedrichshafen-Meistershofen, Kappelhof and Berg (b Friedrichshafen). Friedrichshafen's freight yard (Friedrichshafen Gbf) lies just south the junction of the Southern Railway to Ulm and the Bodenseegürtel Railway towards Lindau.

== See also ==
- Rail transport in Germany
