= Klaus in Vorarlberg railway station =

Railway station in Vorarlberg, Austria

Klaus in Vorarlberg

General information
- Location: Treietstraße; 6833 Klaus; Austria
- Coordinates: 47°18′31.7808″N 09°37′28.8156″E
- Owner: Austrian Federal Railways (ÖBB)
- Operator: ÖBB
- Line: Vorarlberg railway

History
- Opened: 1 July 1872

Services
Preceding station	Vorarlberg S-Bahn	Following station
Sulz-Röthis towards Bludenz	S1	Götzis towards Lindau-Insel
Rankweil towards Feldkirch	R5	Götzis towards St. Margrethen
Location
- Location within Austria Location within Vorarlberg

Klaus in Vorarlberg railway station (German: Bahnhof Klaus in Vorarlberg), formerly Klaus-Koblach railway station, is a railway station in Klaus in the Feldkirch district of the Austrian federal state of Vorarlberg. The station is owned and operated by the Austrian Federal Railways (ÖBB).

== Services ==
As of the December 2023 timetable change, the following regional train services call at the station (the S1 and R5 are both also part of Bodensee S-Bahn):

- Vorarlberg S-Bahn:
  - S1: half-hourly service between Bludenz and Bregenz Hafen, with some trains continuing to Lindau-Insel.
  - R5: on weekdays, six trains per day to St. Margrethen, three to Feldkirch.

== See also ==
- Rail transport in Austria
