= Klushund =

A playing card from Vorarlberg showing the Klushund

The Klushund (Alemannic German for "dog of Klaus") is a mythical demonic dog from Vorarlberg, Austria. It is described as a giant black hound with glowing, plate-sized eyes, which haunts in dark forest around the Rhine Valley. Encountering it brings illness and misfortune.

== Name ==
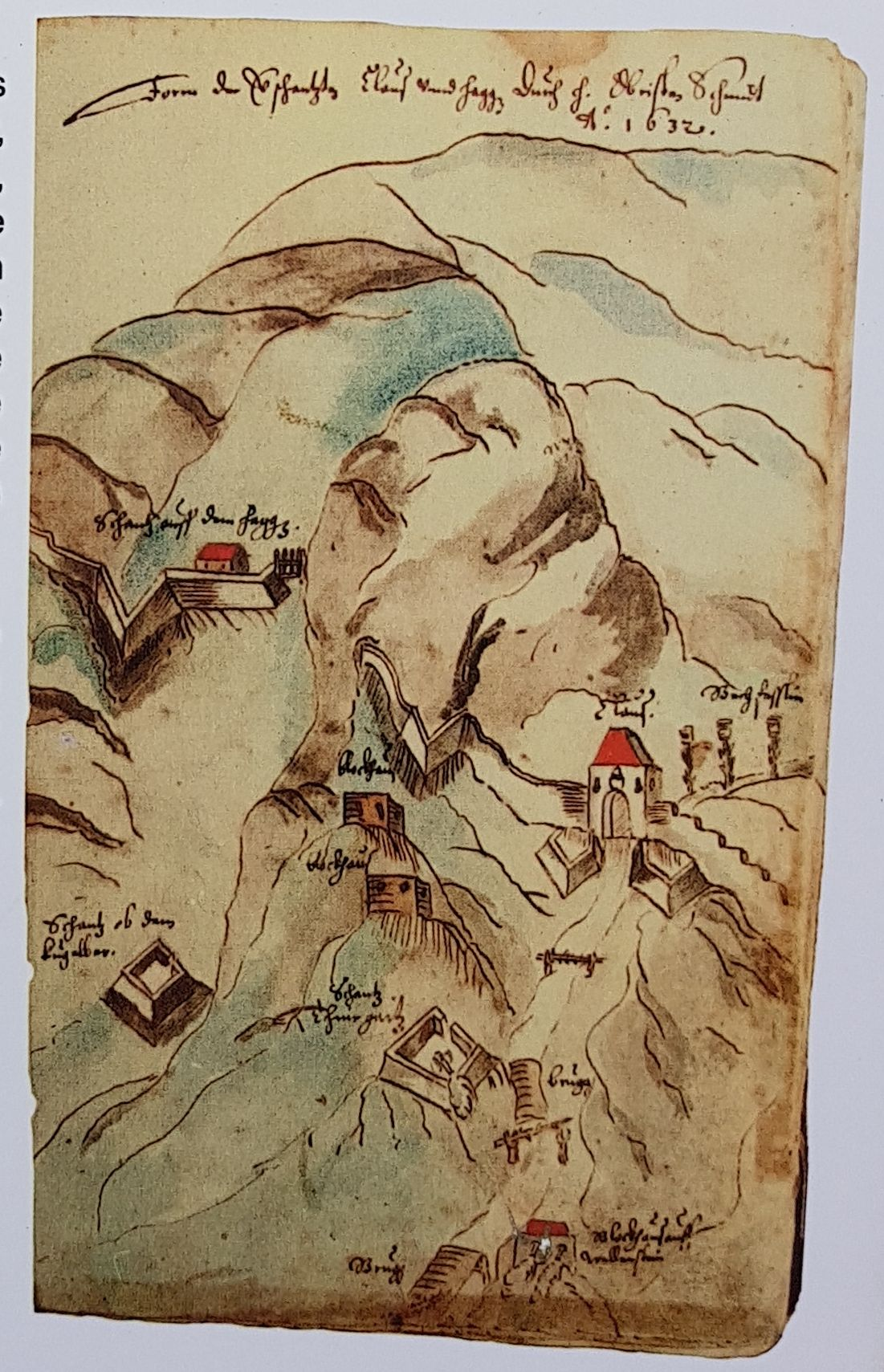
Historical representation of the military blocking position "Klause", 1647 in Lochau, Vorarlberg, Austria.

Numerous legends about the Klushund are widespread throughout Vorarlberg.

According to one of the most common legends, the entity originates from a human traitor who betrayed the city of Bregenz to the Swedish army under the General of Carl Gustaf Wrangel during the Thirty Year's war. Wrangel promised a local man a treasure and in return he showed them a secret passage through the fortified checkpoint in Lochau called Klause. He was then transformed into the Klushund as punishment for his treason.

Other legends revolve around sightings of the demonic entity in the once dark and feared Kluser Wald between the municipalities Götzis and Klaus, which is also said to be the source of the creature's name.

== Historical background ==
The existence of a traitor as depicted in the legend is historically unsupported by documents and records, leading historians to suspect the tale was fabricated to cover up the military and political leadership's own failures in the defeat against the Swedish forces.
