= Schwarzach in Vorarlberg railway station =

Railway station in Vorarlberg, Austria

Schwarzach in Vorarlberg
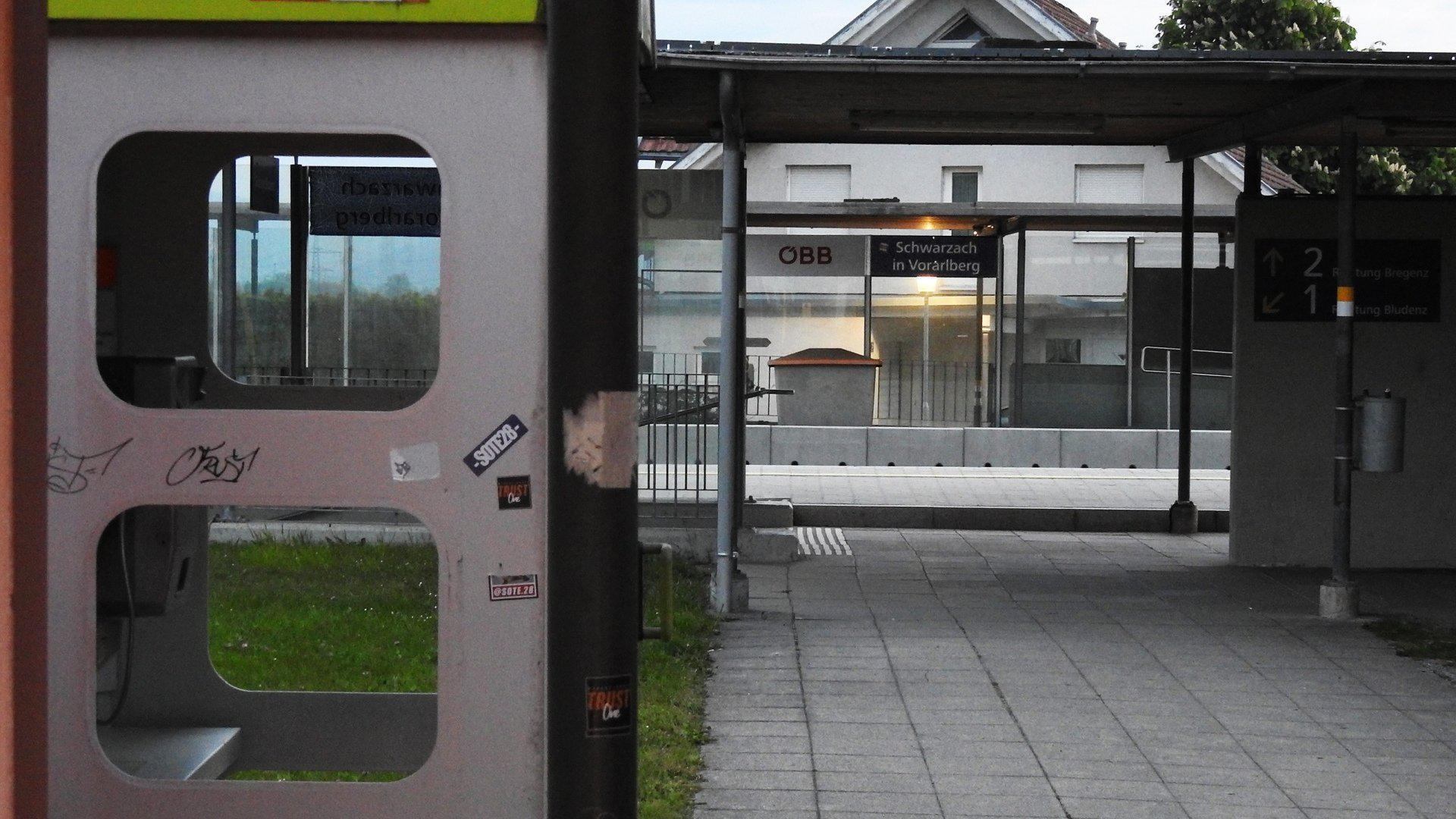
- The station platform in 2019

General information
- Location: Schwarzach, Vorarlberg; Austria
- Coordinates: 47°26′46″N 9°45′15″E
- Owner: Austrian Federal Railways (ÖBB)
- Line: Vorarlberg line
- Distance: 18.6 km (11.6 mi) from Lindau-Insel
- Train operators: ÖBB
- Connections: Landbus Unterland

Services
Preceding station	Vorarlberg S-Bahn	Following station
Haselstauden towards Bludenz	S1	Wolfurt towards Lindau-Insel
Haselstauden towards Feldkirch	R5	Wolfurt towards St. Margrethen
Location
- Location within Austria Location within Vorarlberg

Schwarzach in Vorarlberg railway station (German: Bahnhof Schwarzach in Vorarlberg) is a railway station in the municipality of Schwarzach, in the district of Bregenz, in the Austrian state of Vorarlberg. It is located on the Vorarlberg line of Austrian Federal Railways (ÖBB).

== Services ==
As of the December 2023 timetable change, the following services stop at Schwarzach in Vorarlberg:

- Vorarlberg S-Bahn
  - S1: half-hourly service between Bludenz and Bregenz Hafen, with some trains continuing to Lindau-Insel.
  - R5: on weekdays, seven trains per day to St. Margrethen, six to Dornbirn, three to Feldkirch.
