= Haselstauden railway station =

Railway station in Vorarlberg, Austria

Haselstauden

General information
- Location: Staudenweg, 6850 Haselstauden; Austria
- Coordinates: 47°25′56.8668″N 09°44′57.552″E
- Owner: Austrian Federal Railways (ÖBB)
- Line: Vorarlberg line
- Train operators: ÖBB

Services
Preceding station	Vorarlberg S-Bahn	Following station
Dornbirn towards Bludenz	S1	Schwarzach in Vorarlberg towards Lindau-Insel
Dornbirn towards Feldkirch	R5	Schwarzach in Vorarlberg towards St. Margrethen
Location
- Location within Austria Location within Vorarlberg

Haselstauden railway station (German: Bahnhof Haselstauden) is a railway station in the municipality of Haselstauden, in the district of Dornbirn, in the Austrian state of Vorarlberg. It is located on the Vorarlberg line. The station is owned and operated by Austrian Federal Railways (ÖBB).

== Services ==
As of the December 2023 timetable change, the following services stop at Haselstauden:

- Vorarlberg S-Bahn:
  - S1: half-hourly service between Bludenz and Bregenz Hafen, with some trains continuing to Lindau-Insel.
  - R5: on weekdays, seven trains per day to St. Margrethen, six to Dornbirn, three to Feldkirch.
