= Hohenems railway station =

Railway station in Vorarlberg, Austria

Hohenems
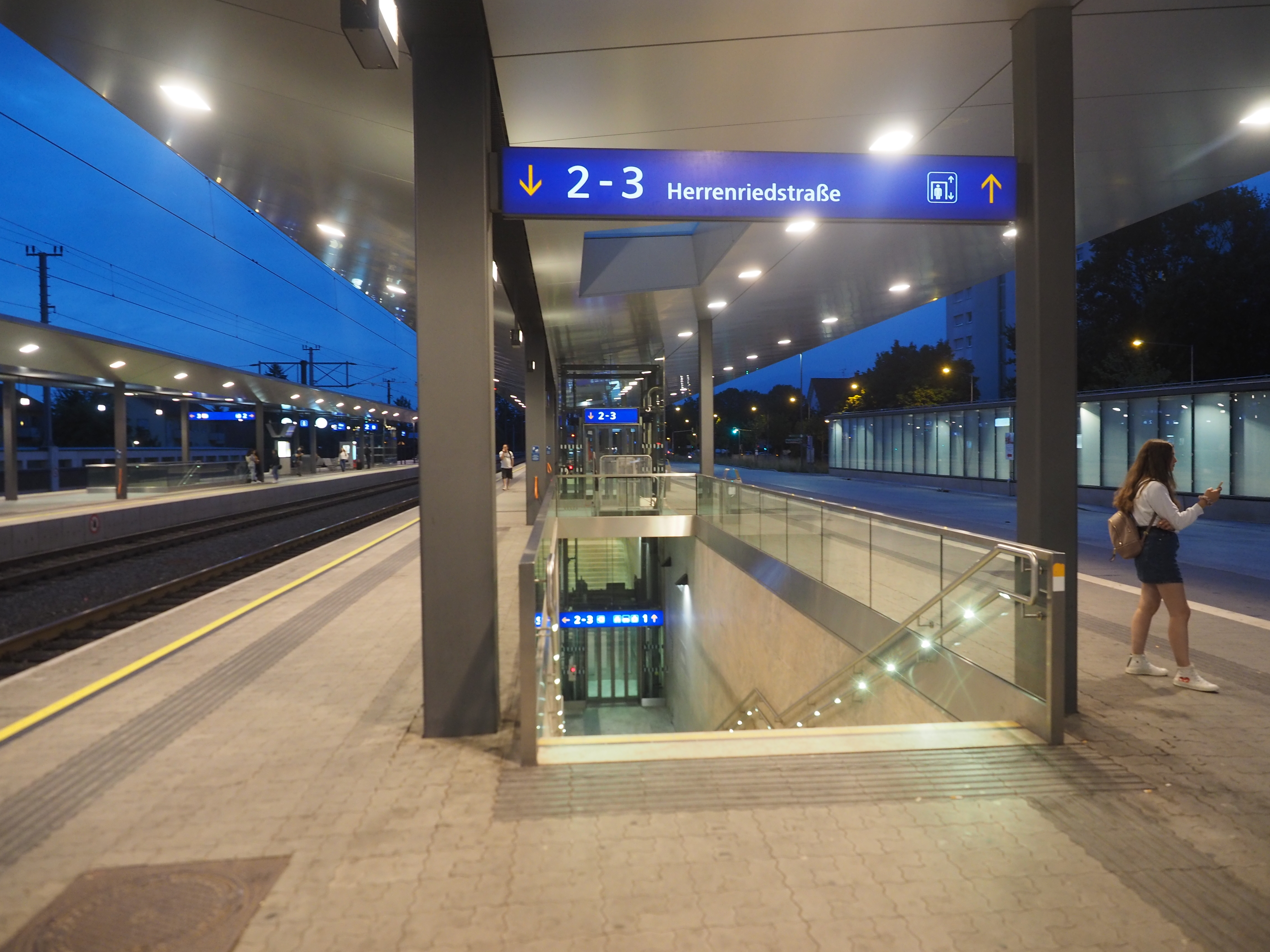
- Station platforms in 2019.

General information
- Location: Angelika-Kauffmann-Straße 5; 6845 Hohenems; Austria
- Coordinates: 47°21′52.4088″N 09°40′52.9644″E
- Elevation: 421 m (AA)
- Owner: Austrian Federal Railways (ÖBB)
- Operator: ÖBB
- Line: Vorarlberg railway

History
- Opened: 1 July 1872

Services
Preceding station	ÖBB	Following station
Götzis towards Bludenz	REX 1	Dornbirn towards Lindau-Insel
Preceding station	DB Fernverkehr	Following station
Rankweil One-way operation	ICE 62	Dornbirn towards Münster Hbf
Preceding station		Following station
Altach toward Wien Westbahnhof	WESTbahn	Dornbirn toward Lindau-Insel
Preceding station	Vorarlberg S-Bahn	Following station
Altach towards Bludenz	S1	Hatlerdorf towards Lindau-Insel
Götzis towards Feldkirch	R5	Dornbirn-Schoren towards St. Margrethen
Location
- Location within Austria Location within Vorarlberg

Hohenems railway station (German: Bahnhof Hohenems) is a railway station in Hohenems in the Dornbirn district of the Austrian federal state of Vorarlberg. It was opened on 1 July 1872, together with the rest of the Vorarlberg railway. The station is owned and operated by the Austrian Federal Railways (ÖBB).

== Services ==
As of the December 2024 timetable change, the following regional train services call at Hohenems station (the S1 and R5 are both also part of Bodensee S-Bahn):

- WESTbahn green: one train per day and direction to Lindau-Insel and Wien Westbahnhof.
- REX 1: trains between Bludenz and Lindau-Insel.
- Vorarlberg S-Bahn:
  - S1: half-hourly service between Bludenz and Bregenz Hafen, with some trains continuing to Lindau-Insel.
  - R5: on weekdays, six trains per day to St. Margrethen, three to Feldkirch.

== See also ==
- Rail transport in Austria
