= Hatlerdorf =

Coordinates: 47.4019°N 9.7383°E

Hatlerdorf is the second precinct of the City of Dornbirn (Vorarlberg, Austria).

== History ==
Hatlerdorf is most likely the oldest settled area in Dornbirn. Relatively late - in 1902, a year after Dornbirn's elevation to municipal status - "Niederdorf" (now called Markt), Hatlerdorf, Oberdorf and Haselstauden were officially declared to be the four precincts of the new municipality. In 1994 the new areas in the northwestern part of the precinct were made precincts themselves - the 5th precinct Rohrbach and the 6th precinct Schoren.

== Economy ==
For a long time Hatlerdorf was predominantly agricultural, and it continues to play a leading role within Dornbirn's important agricultural sector. During times of industrialization large textile enterprises settled on the southern edge of the precinct (Wallenmahd). Today, Hatlerdorf is rapidly becoming an industrial center, with such larger firms as Zumtobel Lighting, the Vorarlberg Spar Central Offices and Distribution, J.M. Fußenegger, the EHG Steel Center, and Blum Fittings.

== Infrastructure ==
Hatlerdorf has its own post office, several bank branches, the Catholic parish St. Leopold, the Dornbirn Municipal Hospital and a residential care home for the elderly.

== Transportation ==
The L 190 highway cuts through the precinct. Shortly before reaching the 1. Bezirk it crosses the L 204 Lustenauer Strasse. The Rheintal/Walgau Autobahn passes through the precinct area, but the closest direct connection is Dornbirn South. Since the opening of the Vorarlberg Railway Vorarlbergbahn in 1872 Hatlerdorf has had its own railroad station.

== Geography ==
Hatlerdorf extends from the Dornbirn Ach Dornbirner Ach in the northeast and the foot of the Karren mountain in the southeast out into the Rhine valley plain, bordering in the west on Lustenau and in the south on Hohenems.

== Sights ==
=== Parish church St. Leopold (built 1860 – 1866) ===
This Neo-Romantic Roman Catholic parish church (Pfarrkirche Dornbirn-Hatlerdorf / Pfarrkirche Dornbirn-St. Leopold) is consecrated to St. Leopold and belongs to the Deanery of Dornbirn, in the Diocese of Feldkirch. It is under historic monument protection.

== History ==
Dornbirn’s rustic second district church historically belonged to the central district (Dornbirn-Markt) parish of St. Martin. As Hatlerdorf’s population began to grow in the second half of the 18th century there was increasing interest in creating a local place for pastoral care. In 1790 a modest church was built just south of the Dornbirn river (Ache), on the former rural highway near the main Hatler fountain, in Hatlerdorf’s historic center. This first church was consecrated to Leopold III, who also remained the parish patron saint. A wayside cross commemorates this original church, known locally as the “Hatler Chapel”. In 1791 a chaplaincy was built, which in 1846 was elevated to become a dependency of the parish of St. Martin, located in the center of Dornbirn. In 1896 St. Leopold church became a parish in its own right. From 2000 to 2002 the church underwent extensive renovation for the first time since its original construction.

== Architecture ==
The Neo-Romantic church was built from 1860 to 1866, in a so-called Munich round arch style (Münchner Rundbogenstil), according to the plans of the Bavarian Court Building Inspector Eduard Riedel. The extensive, richly colored paintings of the barrel vaulting interior were carried out according to the theological iconography of the parish priest at that time, Ferdinand Gierer. The Suebian painter Hermann Lang was contracted to carry out the total pictorial concept, together with the Württemberg painter Hans Martin. Later, a new sacristy and baptismal chapel were built according to the plans of architect Anton Rhomberg.

== Interior ==
In 1909 and 1913 the interior decoration and furnishings were carried out in wood, the preferred building material of the times. This included the side altars and the three chandeliers. The mensa altar was designed and carried out by the sculptor Herbert Albrecht, the organ by the organ construction firm Gebrüder Mayer. In 1965 the organ was re-built. A bell was cast in 1790 by Kaspar Gunz.

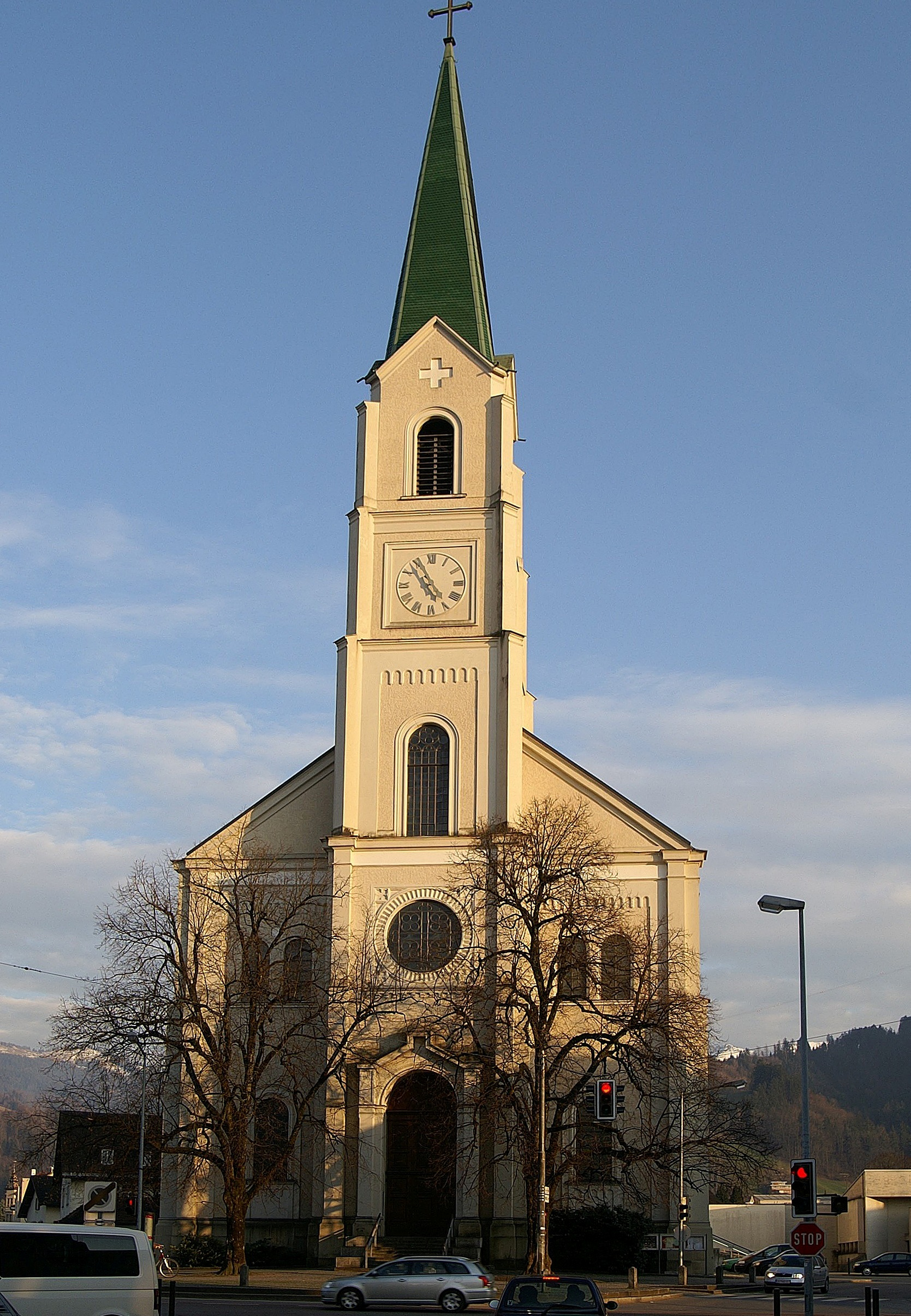
Pfarrkirche St. Leopold

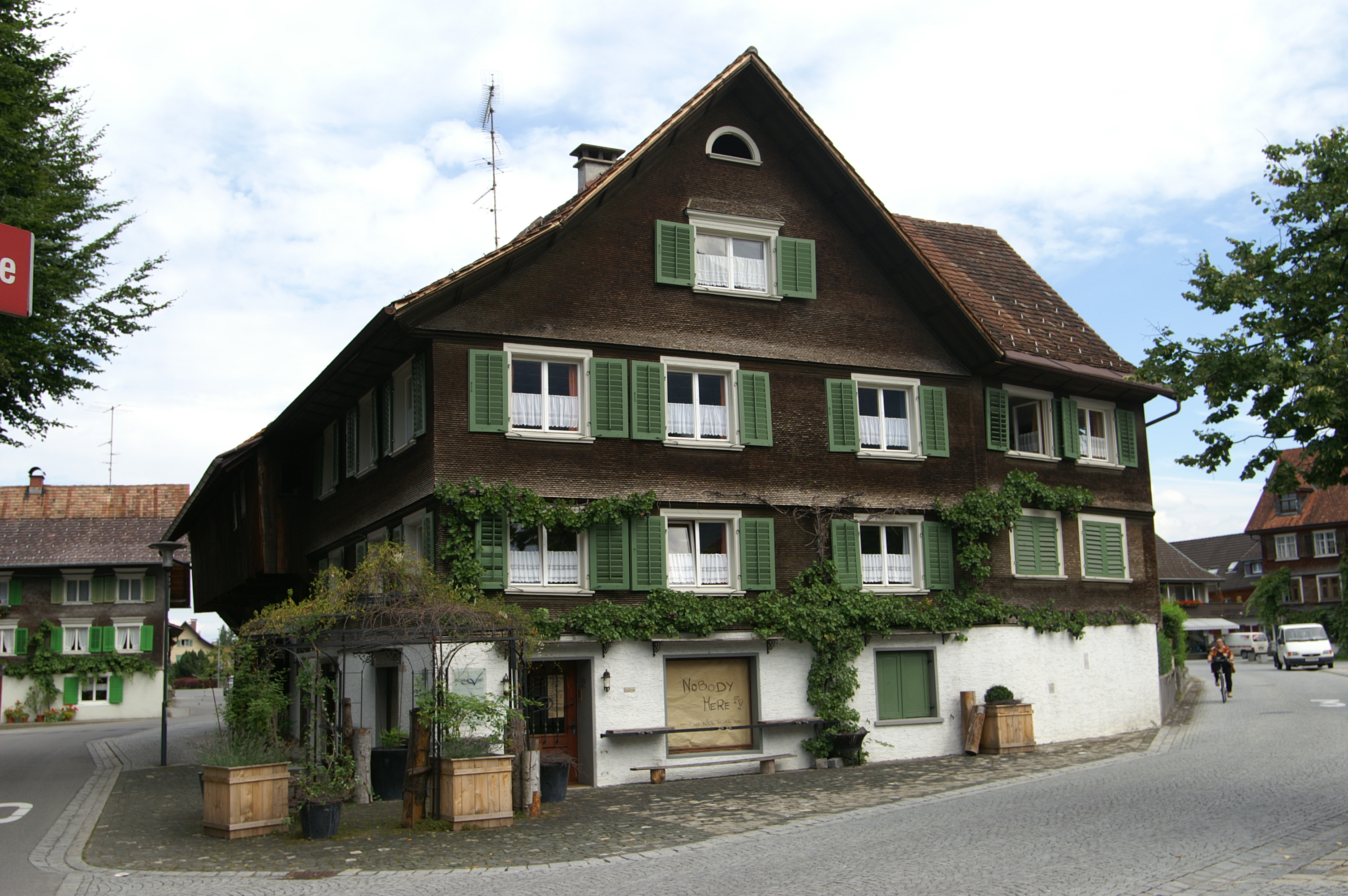
alter Dorfkern

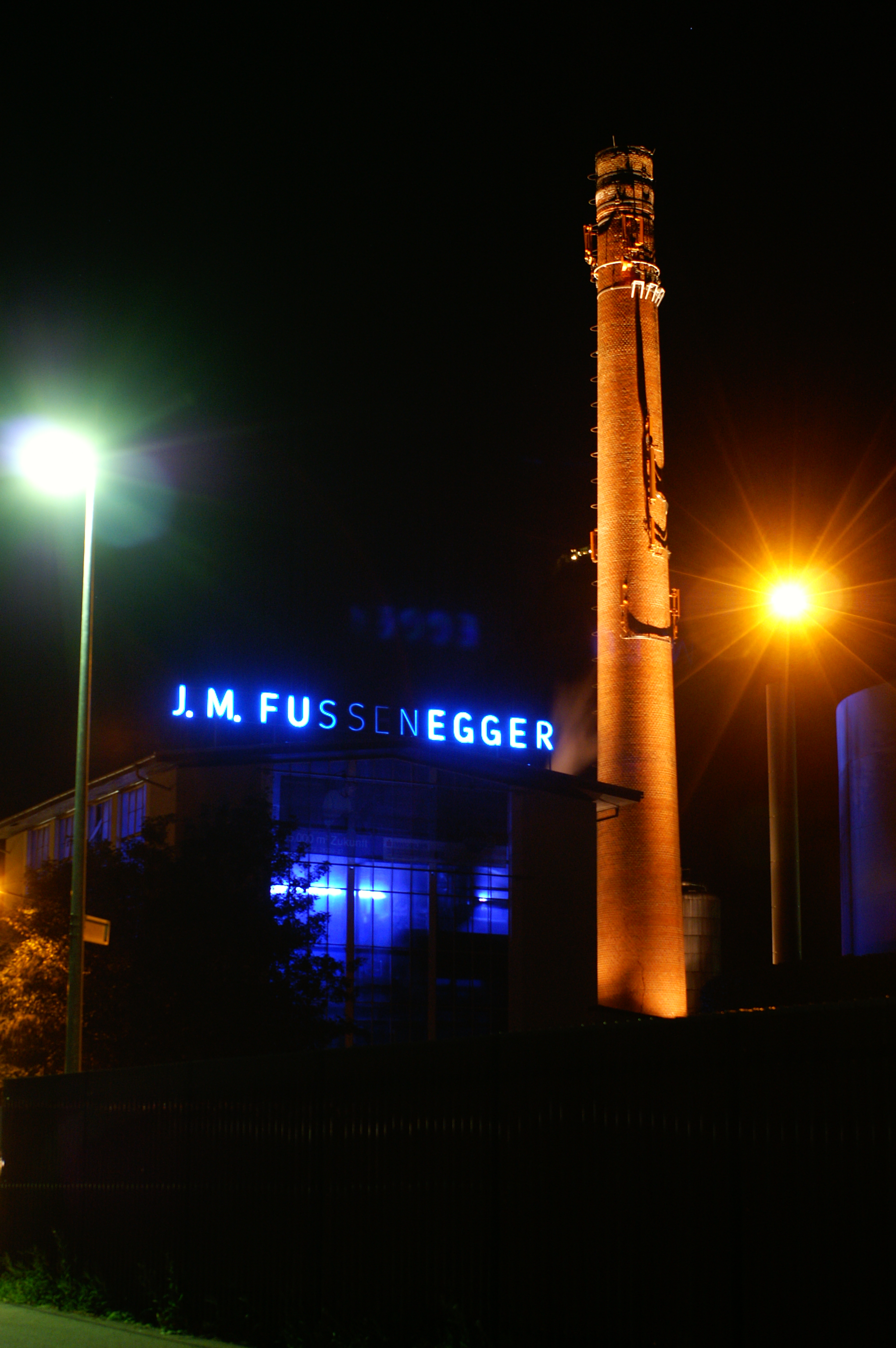
IM.Fussenegger
