= Dornbirn-Schoren railway station =

Railway station in Vorarlberg, Austria

Dornbirn-Schoren
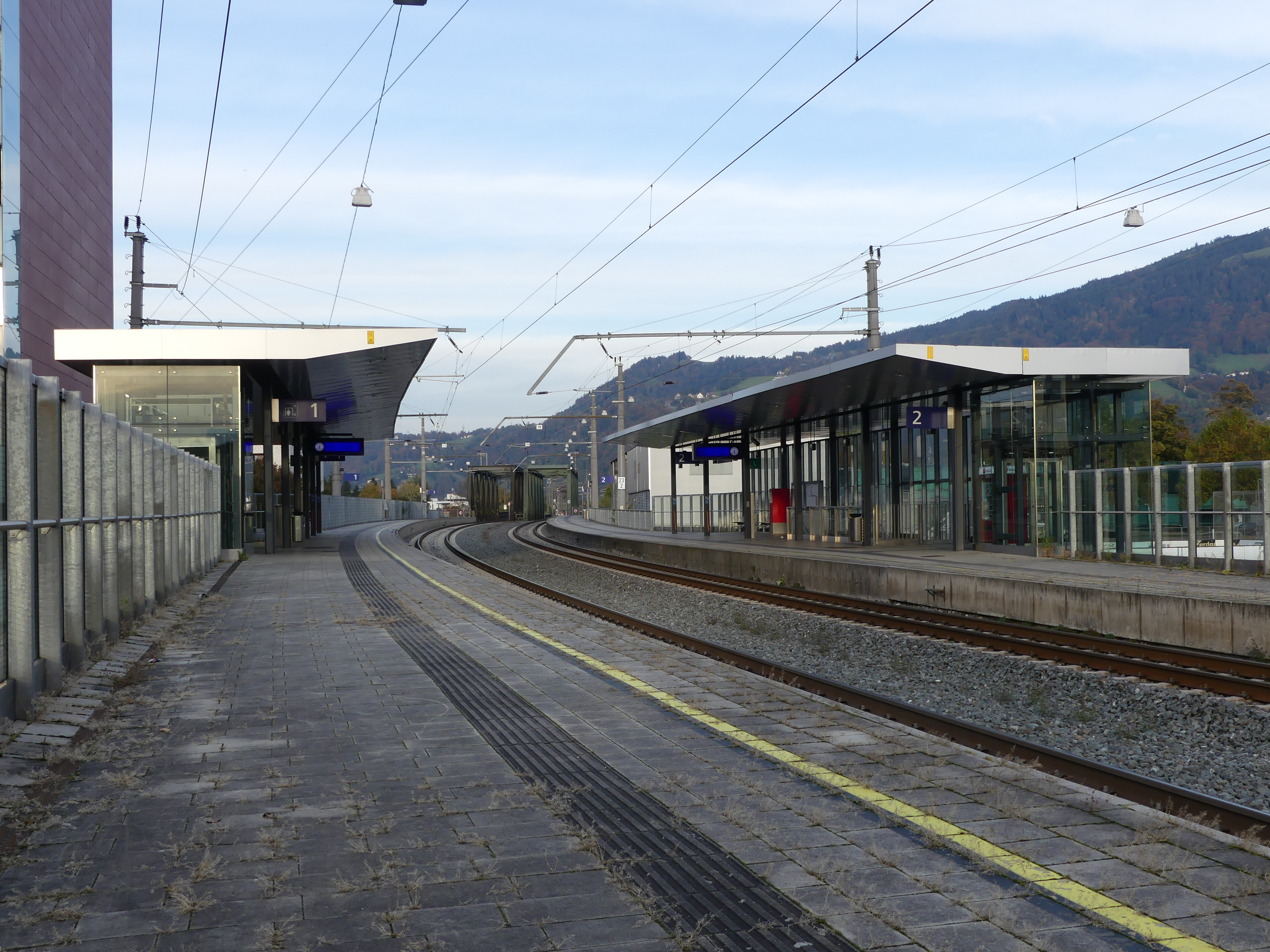
- Station platforms in 2019.

General information
- Location: Höchsterstraße; 6850 Dornbirn; Austria
- Coordinates: 47°24′47.034″N 09°43′34.1508″E
- Owner: Austrian Federal Railways (ÖBB)
- Operator: ÖBB
- Line: Vorarlberg railway

Services
Preceding station	Vorarlberg S-Bahn	Following station
Hatlerdorf towards Bludenz	S1	Dornbirn towards Lindau-Insel
Hohenems towards Feldkirch	R5	Dornbirn towards St. Margrethen
Location
- Location within Austria Location within Vorarlberg

Dornbirn-Schoren railway station (German: Bahnhof Dornbirn-Schoren) is a railway station in Dornbirn in the Dornbirn district of the Austrian federal state of Vorarlberg. The station is owned and operated by the Austrian Federal Railways (ÖBB).

== Services ==
As of the December 2023 timetable change, the following regional train services call at Dornbirn-Schoren station (the S1 and R5 are both also part of Bodensee S-Bahn):

- Vorarlberg S-Bahn:
  - S1: half-hourly service between Bludenz and Bregenz Hafen, with some trains continuing to Lindau-Insel.
  - R5: on weekdays, six trains per day to St. Margrethen, three to Feldkirch.

== See also ==
- Rail transport in Austria
