= Wolfurt railway station =

Railway station in Vorarlberg, Austria

Wolfurt
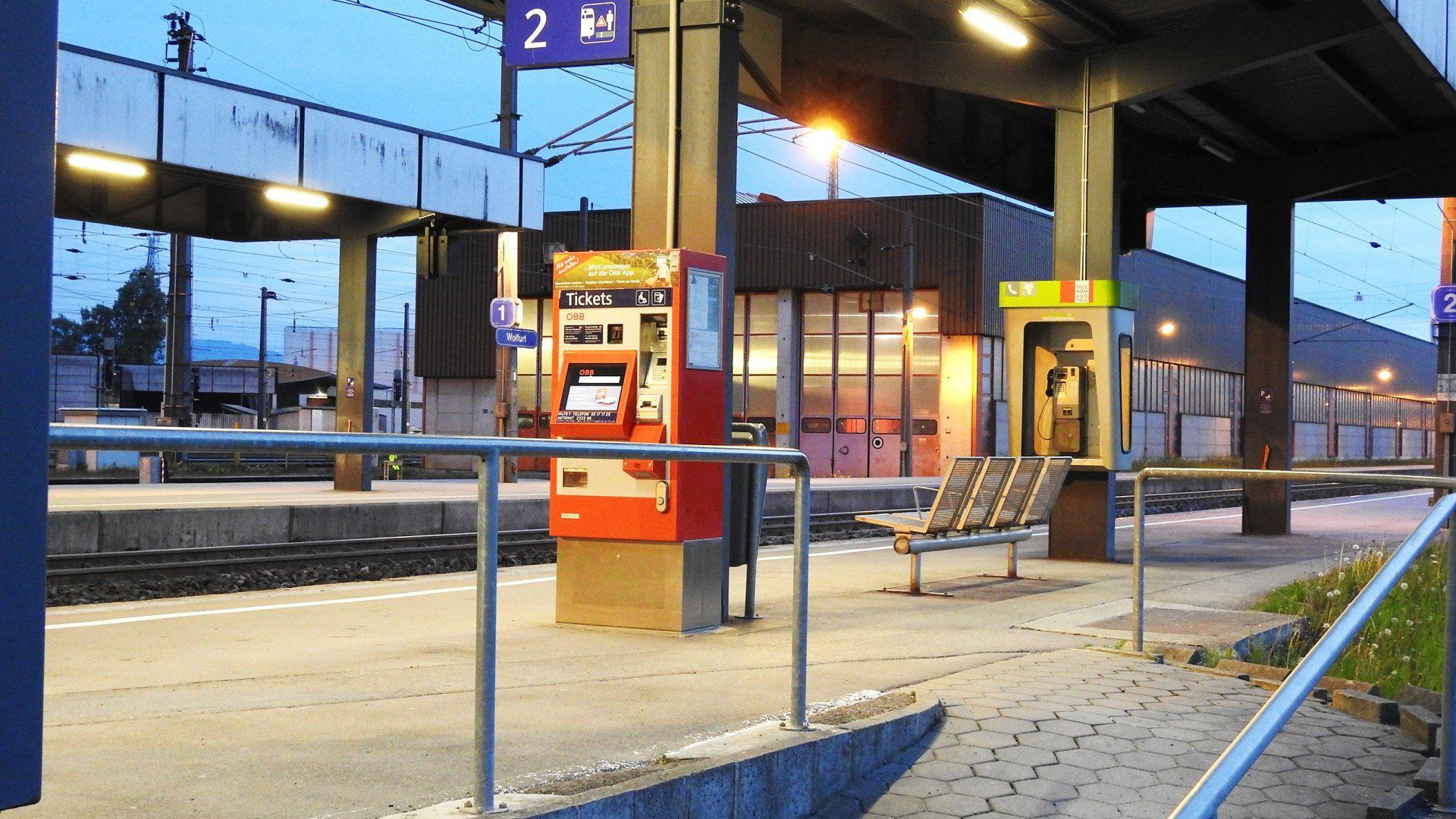
- The station platform in 2019

General information
- Location: Wolfurt, Vorarlberg; Austria
- Coordinates: 47°27′25″N 9°44′28″E
- Owner: Austrian Federal Railways (ÖBB)
- Line: Vorarlberg line
- Distance: 17.0 km (10.6 mi) from Lindau-Insel
- Train operators: ÖBB
- Connections: Landbus Unterland

Services
Preceding station	Vorarlberg S-Bahn	Following station
Schwarzach in Vorarlberg towards Bludenz	S1	Lauterach towards Lindau-Insel
Schwarzach in Vorarlberg towards Feldkirch	R5	Lauterach towards St. Margrethen
Location
- Location within Austria Location within Vorarlberg

Wolfurt railway station (German: Bahnhof Wolfurt) is a railway station in the municipality of Wolfurt, in the district of Bregenz, in the Austrian state of Vorarlberg. It is located on the Vorarlberg line of Austrian Federal Railways (ÖBB). Adjacent to the station is the Wolfurt Freight Centre, also known as ÖBB Terminal Wolfurt, a major goods station.

== Services ==
As of the December 2023 timetable change, the following services stop at Wolfurt:

- Vorarlberg S-Bahn
  - S1: half-hourly service between Bludenz and Bregenz Hafen, with some trains continuing to Lindau-Insel.
  - R5: on weekdays, seven trains per day to St. Margrethen, six to Dornbirn, three to Feldkirch.
