= Altenstadt (Feldkirch) =

District of Feldkirch, Vorarlberg, Austria

- City district
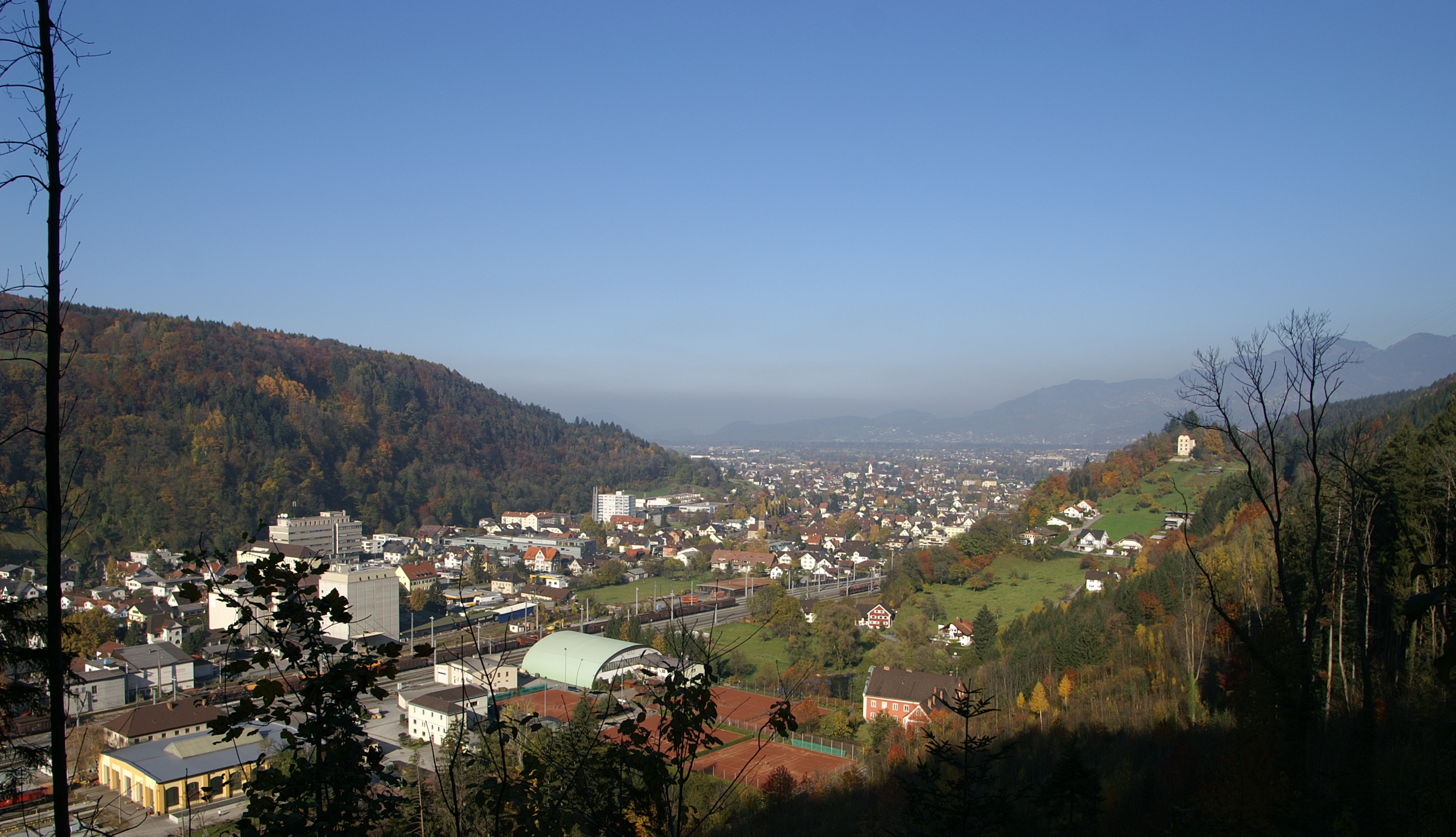
- Interactive map of Altenstadt
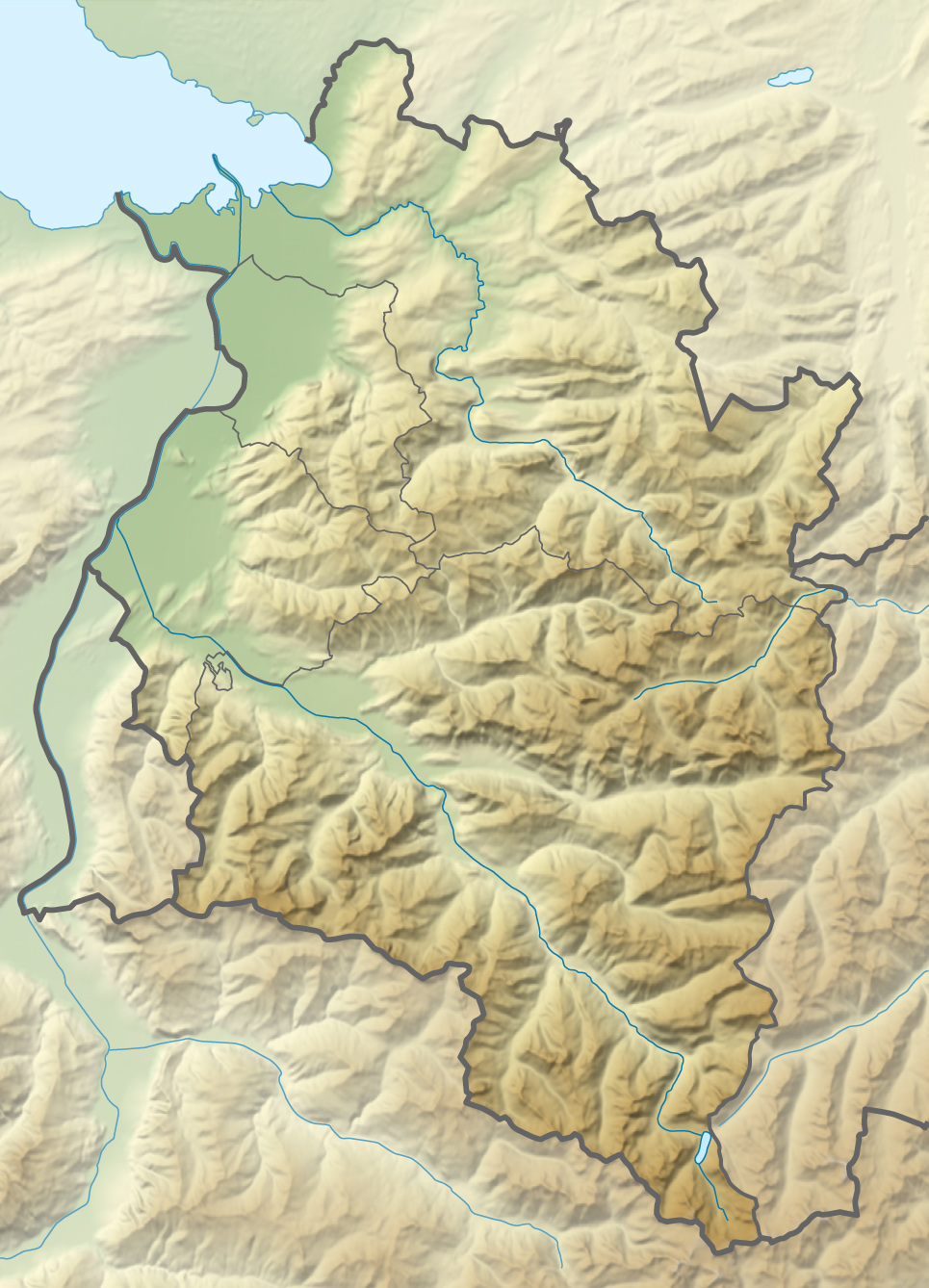
- Location within Vorarlberg Location within Austria
- Coordinates: 47°15′39″N 9°37′00″E
- Country: Austria
- State: Vorarlberg
- District: Feldkirch
- Elevation: 446 m (1,463 ft)
- Time zone: UTC+1 (CET)
  - Summer (DST): UTC+2 (CEST)
- Postal code: 6800

Altenstadt (German pronunciation: [ˈaltn̩ʃtat]) is a district of Feldkirch, a city in the westernmost Austrian state of Vorarlberg. Other districts of Feldkirch are Gisingen, Levis, Nofels, Tisis and Tosters.

== Description ==
Altenstadt railway station is an intermediate stop on the Feldkirch–Buchs railway line to Liechtenstein and Switzerland. The station is served irregularly by the S2 service of Vorarlberg S-Bahn.

In the East of Altenstadt is the 751 m (2,464 ft) high hill Amberg. South of it is the 631 m (2,070 ft) high Ardetzenberg.

== See also ==
- List of cities and towns in Austria
