= Sulz, Vorarlberg =

Sulz
- Municipality
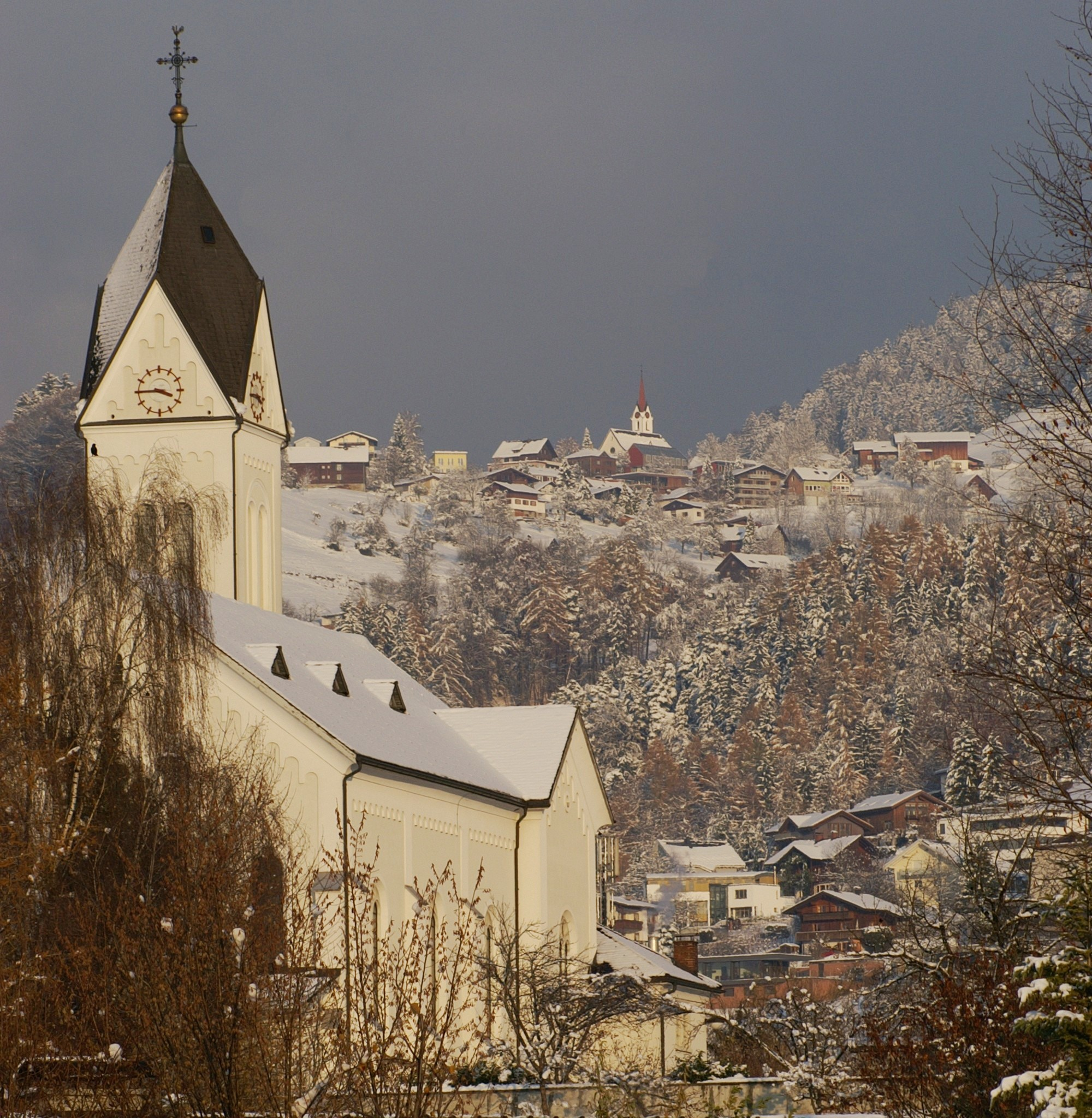

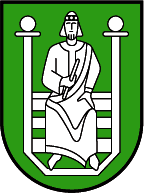
- Coat of arms

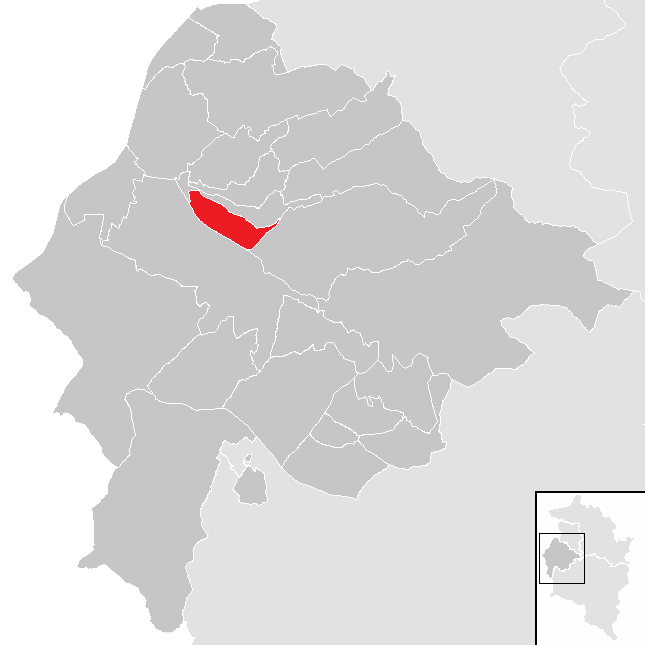
- Location in the district

- Location within Austria
- Coordinates: 47°16′00″N 09°39′00″E
- Country: Austria
- State: Vorarlberg
- District: Feldkirch

Government
  - Mayor: Karl Wutschitz

Area
  - Total: 3.02 km^{2} (1.17 sq mi)
- Elevation: 495 m (1,624 ft)

Population (2018-01-01)
  - Total: 2,527
  - Density: 837/km^{2} (2,170/sq mi)
- Time zone: UTC+1 (CET)
  - Summer (DST): UTC+2 (CEST)
- Postal code: 6832
- Area code: 05522
- Vehicle registration: FK
- Website: www.gemeinde-sulz.at

Sulz (Austrian German pronunciation: [sʊlts]) is a municipality in the district of Feldkirch in the Austrian state of Vorarlberg.

== Population ==
Historical population
Year	Pop.	±%
1869	647	—
1880	650	+0.5%
1890	716	+10.2%
1900	793	+10.8%
1910	793	+0.0%
1923	730	−7.9%
1934	811	+11.1%
1939	822	+1.4%
1951	1,002	+21.9%
1961	1,232	+23.0%
1971	1,884	+52.9%
1981	1,952	+3.6%
1991	2,123	+8.8%
2001	2,189	+3.1%
2011	2,382	+8.8%

== Transport ==
Sulz-Röthis railway station is an intermediate station on the Vorarlberg railway line (Vorarlbergbahn) traversing Vorarlberg in a north-south direction. The railway station is called at by the S1 regional train service of Vorarlberg S-Bahn, operated by Austrian Federal Railways (ÖBB).
