= Altenstadt railway station =

Railway station in Feldkirch, Vorarlberg

Altenstadt
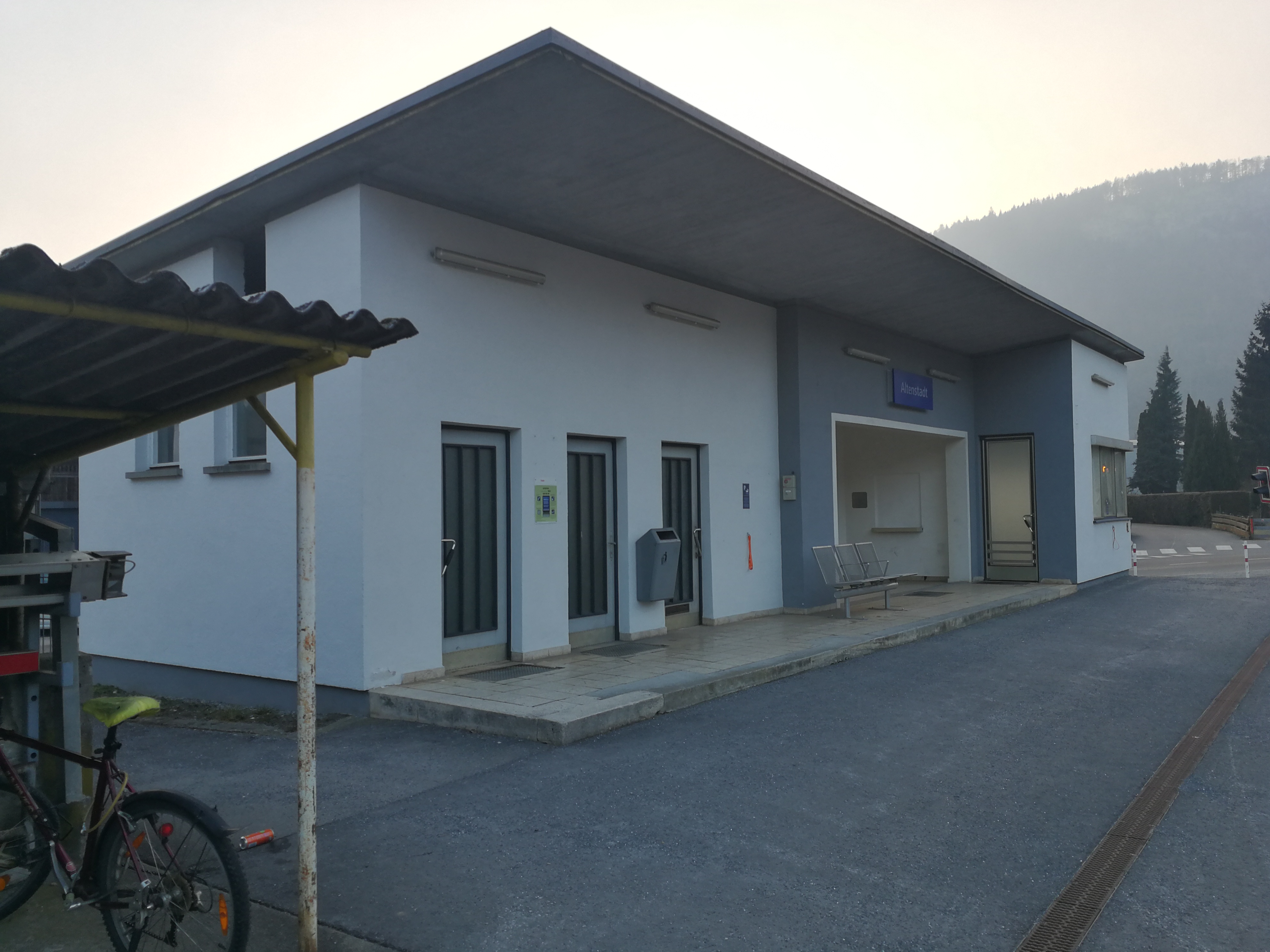

General information
- Location: Reichstresse 46, 6800 Altenstadt (Feldkirch); Austria
- Coordinates: 47°15′22.9788″N 09°36′55.3608″E
- Elevation: 449 m (AA)
- Owner: ÖBB
- Line: Feldkirch–Buchs
- Platforms: 1
- Tracks: 1

History
- Opened: 1872

Services
Preceding station	Vorarlberg S-Bahn	Following station
Gisingen towards Buchs SG	S2	Feldkirch Terminus
Location
- Location within Austria Location within Vorarlberg

Altenstadt railway station is a railway station in the Altenstadt district of the town of Feldkirch in the westernmost Austrian Federal State of Vorarlberg. The station is located on the Feldkirch–Buchs railway line and is served by regional trains only.

The station is owned and operated by Austrian Federal Railways (ÖBB). It is one of five stations in the city of Feldkirch. The others are Feldkirch, Feldkirch Amberg, Gisingen and Tisis.

== Services ==
As of the December 2023 timetable change, the following regional train service calls at the station:

- Vorarlberg S-Bahn S2: on weekdays, eleven trains per day to both Buchs SG and Feldkirch

== See also ==
- Rail transport in Austria
