= Hatlerdorf railway station =

Railway station in Vorarlberg, Austria

Hatlerdorf

General information
- Location: Schweizerstraße 32; 6850 Hatlerdorf; Austria
- Coordinates: 47°11′43.1952″N 09°43′29.8956″E
- Owner: Austrian Federal Railways (ÖBB)
- Operator: ÖBB
- Line: Vorarlberg railway

Services
Preceding station	Vorarlberg S-Bahn	Following station
Hohenems towards Bludenz	S1	Dornbirn-Schoren towards Lindau-Insel
Location
- Location within Austria Location within Vorarlberg

Hatlerdorf railway station (German: Bahnhof Hatlerdorf) is a railway station in Hatlerdorf (Dornbirn) in the Dornbirn district of the Austrian federal state of Vorarlberg. It is an intermediate station on the Vorarlberg railway.

The station is owned and operated by the Austrian Federal Railways (ÖBB).

== Services ==
As of the December 2023 timetable change, the following regional train service calls at Hatlerdorf station (the S1 is also part of Bodensee S-Bahn):

- Vorarlberg S-Bahn S1: half-hourly service between Bludenz and Bregenz Hafen, with some trains continuing to Lindau-Insel.

== See also ==
- Rail transport in Austria
