= Rankweil railway station =

Railway station in Vorarlberg, Austria

Rankweil
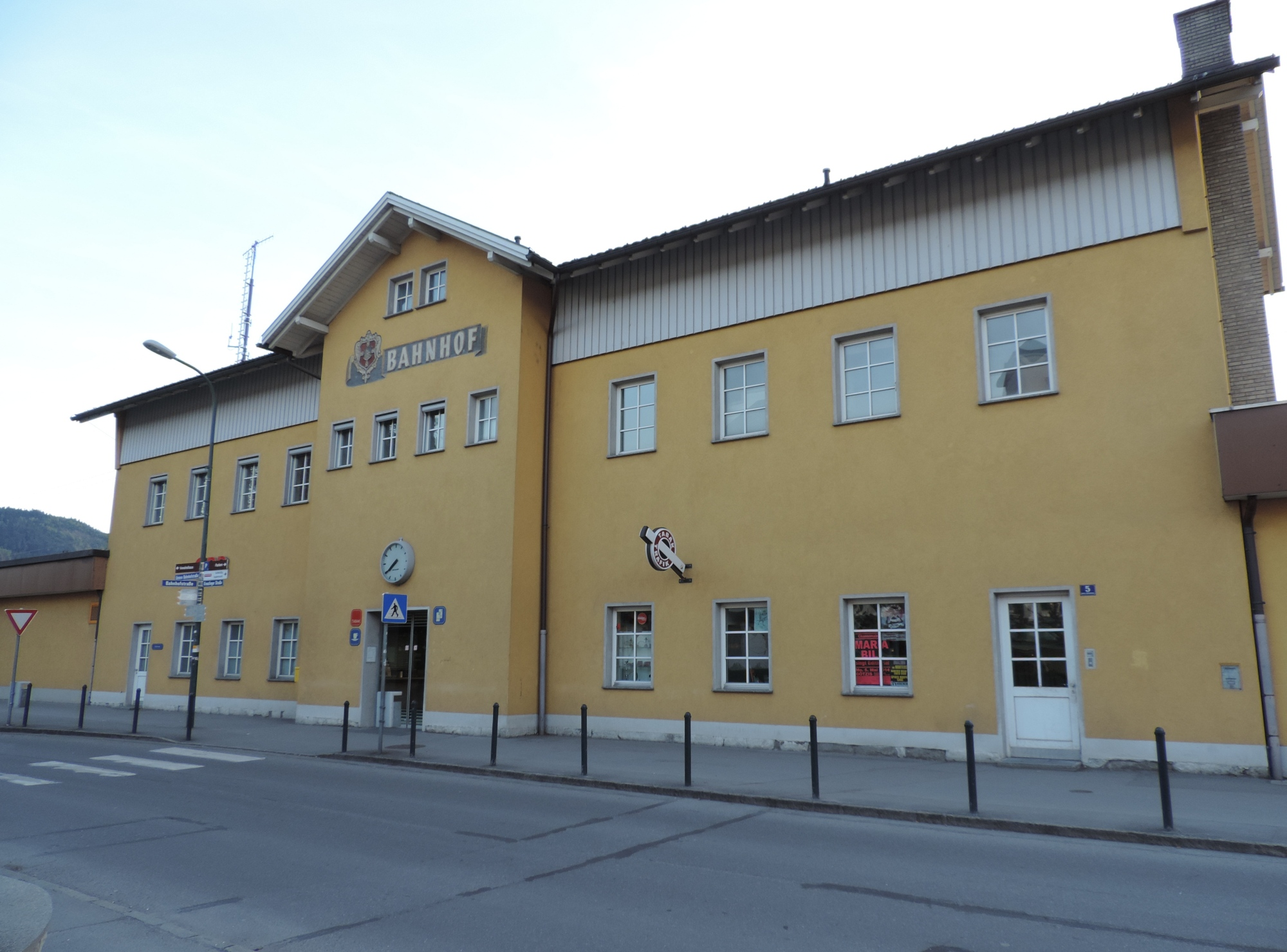
- Former station building in 2014

General information
- Location: Untere Bahnhofstraße 5; 6830 Rankweil; Austria
- Coordinates: 47°16′19.974″N 09°38′13.0308″E
- Elevation: 463 m (AA)
- Owner: Austrian Federal Railways (ÖBB)
- Operator: ÖBB
- Line: Vorarlberg railway

History
- Opened: 1 July 1872

Services
Preceding station	ÖBB	Following station
Feldkirch towards Bludenz	REX 1	Götzis towards Lindau-Insel
Preceding station	DB Fernverkehr	Following station
Feldkirch One-way operation	ICE 62	Hohenems towards Münster Hbf
Preceding station		Following station
Feldkirch toward Wien Westbahnhof	WESTbahn	Götzis toward Lindau-Insel
Preceding station	Vorarlberg S-Bahn	Following station
Feldkirch Amberg towards Bludenz	S1	Sulz-Röthis towards Lindau-Insel
Feldkirch Terminus	R5	Klaus in Vorarlberg towards St. Margrethen
Location
- Location within Austria Location within Vorarlberg

Rankweil railway station (German: Bahnhof Rankweil) is a railway station in Rankweil in the Feldkirch district of the Austrian federal state of Vorarlberg. It was opened on 1 July 1872, together with the rest of the Vorarlberg railway. The station is owned and operated by the Austrian Federal Railways (ÖBB).

== Services ==
As of the December 2024 timetable change, the following regional train services call at the station (the S1 and R5 are both also part of Bodensee S-Bahn):

- WESTbahn green: one train per day and direction to Lindau-Insel and Wien Westbahnhof.
- REX 1: trains between Bludenz and Lindau-Insel.
- Vorarlberg S-Bahn:
  - S1: half-hourly service between Bludenz and Bregenz Hafen, with some trains continuing to Lindau-Insel.
  - R5: on weekdays, six trains per day to St. Margrethen, three to Feldkirch.

== See also ==
- Rail transport in Austria
