= Feldkirch Amberg railway station =

Railway station in Vorarlberg, Austria

Feldkirch Amberg

General information
- Location: Logergasse/Kalkofenweg 1; 6800 Feldkirch; Austria
- Coordinates: 47°15′20.6208″N 09°37′18.1596″E
- Owner: Austrian Federal Railways (ÖBB)
- Operator: ÖBB
- Line: Vorarlberg railway

History
- Opened: 1 July 1872

Services
Preceding station	Vorarlberg S-Bahn	Following station
Feldkirch towards Bludenz	S1	Rankweil towards Lindau-Insel
Location
- Location within Austria Location within Vorarlberg

Feldkirch Amberg railway station (German: Bahnhof Feldkirch-Amberg) is a railway station in the Levis district of the town of Feldkirch in the Feldkirch district of the Austrian federal state of Vorarlberg. It is located near the Amberg Castle (Schloss Amberg) and owned and operated by the Austrian Federal Railways (ÖBB).

The station was opened on 1 July 1872, together with the rest of the Vorarlberg railway.

It is one of five stations in the city of Feldkirch. The others are Altenstadt, Feldkirch, Gisingen and Tisis.

== Services ==
As of the December 2023 timetable change, the following regional train service calls at Feldkirch Amberg station (the S1 is also part of Bodensee S-Bahn):

- Vorarlberg S-Bahn S1: half-hourly service between Bludenz and Bregenz Hafen, with some trains continuing to Lindau-Insel.

== See also ==
- Rail transport in Austria
