= Haselstauden =

Coordinates: 47°25′48″N 9°45′22″E

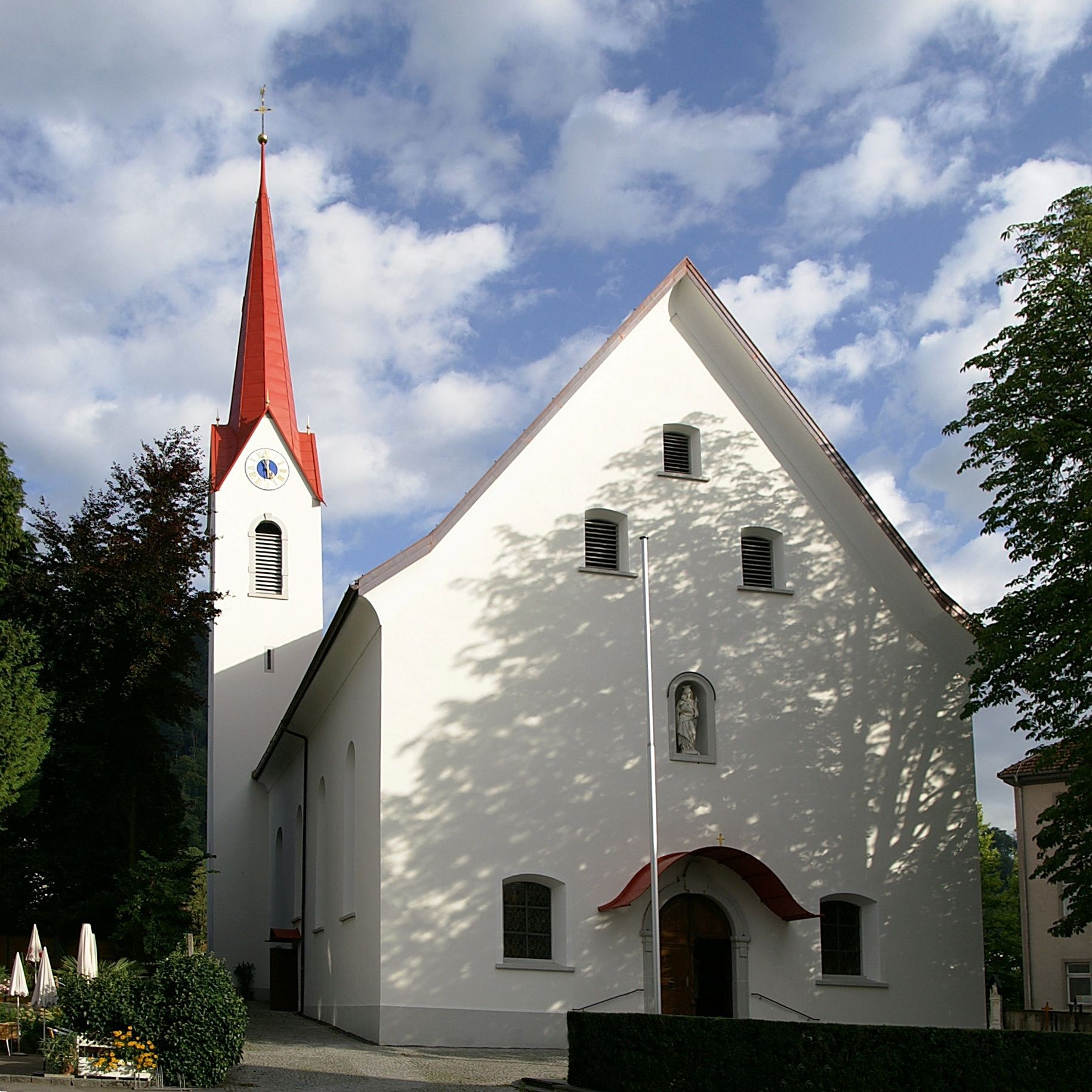
The local church Mariä Heimsuchung

Haselstauden (also known as Hazeltown) has been the fourth district of Dornbirn, Austria since 1902, when Dornbirn was given the status of municipality. It's also the city's northernmost district.

== Geography ==
In the west, Haselstauden borders on the district of Rohrbach, in the south on the district of Markt, in the north on Schwarzach, in the northeast on the community of Alberschwende, and in the east on the community of Schwarzenberg.

== History ==
The earliest documented mention of Haselstauden dates back to 17 September 1249: In a written record by Pope Innocent IV "Stiglingen" is alluded to, along with "Tornburon" (Dornbirn) and "Kuun" (today's parcel Knie). "Stiglingen" signified the populated area along the Stiglbach. The name probably derives from the – commonly used in Austria – word staircase/stairs ("Stiege"). The meaning of this "staircase" has not been definitively reconstructed, but it may have referred to a very rugged river course with sometimes very steeply sloping levels.

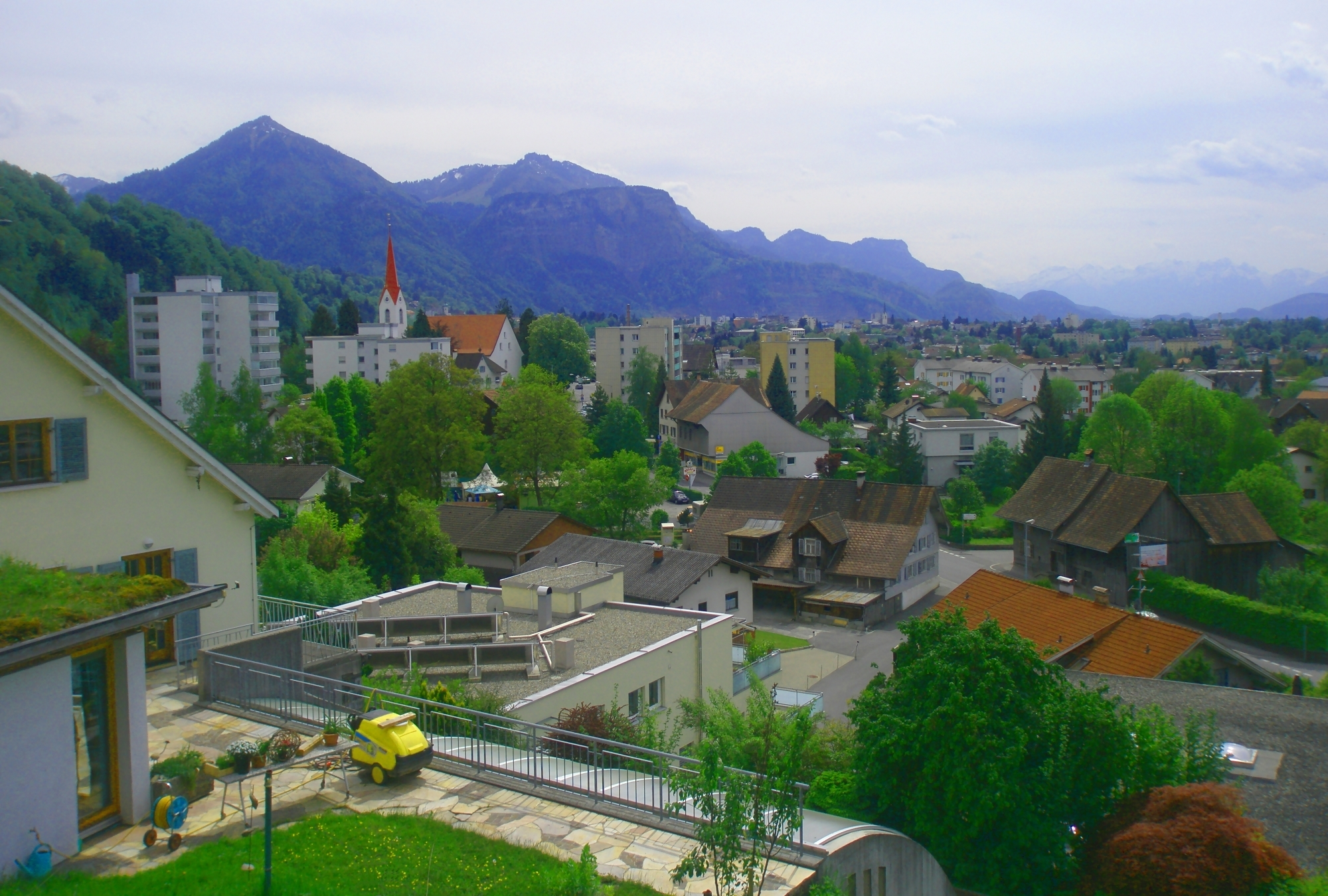

The actual name Haselstauden was first recorded in 1536. In the following decades, an increasing immigration of people from the adjacent mountains was recorded. The small village became more important towards the end of the 18th century when the construction of Dornbirn's first Catholic parish church "Zu unserer Lieben Frau Mariä Heimsuchung" began.

Dornbirn received city rights in 1901 and Haselstauden became its fourth district in 1902. The other districts were Hatlerdorf, Oberdorf and Niederdorf (today "Markt"). In 1994, Rohrbach district was rezoned from sections of Haselstauden and Markt.

== Culture ==
During carnival season there are two events in particular that attract thousands of visitors annually. In addition to the traditional "Funkenfeuer" (bonfire) the Haselstauder carnival parade is one of the largest in the area.

On May 1, an Austrian state holiday, the "Tag der Blasmusik" (literally Day of Brass Music) takes place. Musicians wander through the streets and play music on their wind instruments.

On "gumpiger Donnerstag", the beginning of the carnival itself, roast meat is traditionally stolen as a prank from ovens throughout Dornbirn. On the following day, "bromiger Friday", children blacken themselves with soot.

== Notable people from Haselstauden ==
- Friedrich Rafreider, former player in the Austrian soccer squad
- Armin Diem, poet

== Transport ==
Haselstauden railway station is an intermediate station on the Vorarlberg railway line (Vorarlbergbahn) traversing Vorarlberg in a north–south direction. The railway station is called at by the S1 and R5 regional train services of Vorarlberg S-Bahn, operated by Austrian Federal Railways (ÖBB).
