= Sulz-Röthis railway station =

Railway station in Vorarlberg, Austria

Sulz-Röthis

General information
- Location: Galgengässerle; 6832 Sulz; Austria
- Coordinates: 47°17′41.7624″N 09°38′3.2496″E
- Owner: Austrian Federal Railways (ÖBB)
- Operator: ÖBB
- Line: Vorarlberg railway

History
- Opened: 1 July 1872

Services
Preceding station	Vorarlberg S-Bahn	Following station
Rankweil towards Bludenz	S1	Klaus in Vorarlberg towards Lindau-Insel
Location
- Location within Austria Location within Vorarlberg

Sulz-Röthis railway station (German: Bahnhof Sulz-Röthis) is a railway station in Sulz in the Feldkirch district of the Austrian federal state of Vorarlberg. It is located on the Vorarlberg railway and serves the towns of Sulz and Röthis.

The station is owned and operated by Austrian Federal Railways (ÖBB).

== Services ==
As of the December 2023 timetable change, the following regional train service calls at Sulz-Röthis station (the S1 is also part of Bodensee S-Bahn):

- Vorarlberg S-Bahn S1: half-hourly service between Bludenz and Bregenz Hafen, with some trains continuing to Lindau-Insel.

== See also ==
- Rail transport in Austria
