= Parish Church Hatlerdorf =

Roman Catholic church in Vorarlberg, Austria

Coordinates: 47°24′07″N 9°44′19″E

The Roman Catholic Parish Church of Dornbirn-Hatlerdorf (also: Parish Church of Dornbirn-St. Leopold) stands in the district of Hatlerdorf in the municipality of Dornbirn in the Austrian state of Vorarlberg. It is dedicated to Saint Leopold and belongs to the Deanery of Dornbirn in the Diocese of Feldkirch. The building is under monument protection.

== History ==
For several centuries, the second district of Hatlerdorf in Dornbirn, which was originally predominantly rural, belonged to the parish of St. Martin, whose parish church is located in the central district of Dornbirn-Markt. With increasing population growth in the second half of the 18th century, voices demanding a separate pastoral office for Hatlerdorf also increased. In 1790, therefore, a first church was built in a modest construction in the district south of the Dornbirner Ach, namely on what was then Landstraße, not far from today's Hatler Brunnen in the historic centre of Hatlerdorf. This first church was dedicated to St. Leopold, who also remained patron of the parish. Today, only a wayside cross reminds us of the original church building, which is called the "Hatler Chapel". In 1791, a chaplaincy was established, which in 1846 was upgraded to an external affiliate of the parish of St. Martin. It was not until 1896 that St. Leopold was elevated to a parish of its own. In the years 2000 to 2002, for the first time since the existence of the new church building, there was an overall restoration.

== Architecture ==
The Neo-Romanesque church was built between 1860 and 1866 according to the plans of the Bavarian court building inspector Eduard Riedel in the Munich round arch style. The very colourful painting of the barrel-vaulted Hall was created between 1890 and 1892 according to a theological picture programme by the then Hatler priest Ferdinand Gierer. The Swabian painter Hermann Lang was commissioned with the execution of the pictures, and the Württemberg artist Hans Martin with the decorative painting. To the south of the old sacristy, a new sacristy and a baptistery were added according to a plan by the architect Anton Rhomberg.

== Interior ==
The wooden furnishings of the church were completed in 1909 and 1913 respectively, with the erection of the side altars and the installation of the three chandeliers. The altar was created by the sculptor Herbert Albrecht, the organ in 1879 by the organ-building company Gebrüder Mayer. It was rebuilt in 1965. A bell was cast in 1790 by Kaspar Gunz.

== Literature ==
- Stadtarchiv Dornbirn, ed. (1996), 100 Jahre Pfarre Hatlerdorf, Dornbirner Schriften, 21, Dornbirn
- Anton Ulmer (2004), Pfarrkirche St. Leopold, Dornbirn-Hatlerdorf, Peda-Kunstführer, 580, Passau: Kunstverlag Peda, ISBN 3-89643-580-9
- Dehio Vorarlberg 1983, Dornbirn, Kirchen und Kapellen, Stadtpfarrkirche hl. Leopold in Hatlerdorf, p. 135ff
