= Altach railway station =

Railway station in Vorarlberg, Austria

Altach

General information
- Location: Riedstraße; 6844 Altach; Austria
- Coordinates: 47°21′8.5428″N 09°39′41.58″E
- Owner: Austrian Federal Railways (ÖBB)
- Operator: ÖBB
- Line: Vorarlberg railway

History
- Opened: 1 July 1872

Services
Preceding station		Following station
Götzis toward Wien Westbahnhof	WESTbahn	Hohenems toward Lindau-Insel
Preceding station	Vorarlberg S-Bahn	Following station
Götzis towards Bludenz	S1	Hohenems towards Lindau-Insel
Location
- Location within Austria Location within Vorarlberg

Altach railway station (German: Bahnhof Altach), formerly Altach-Bauern railway station, is a railway station in Altach in the Feldkirch district of the Austrian federal state of Vorarlberg. It was opened on 1 July 1872, together with the rest of the Vorarlberg railway.

The station is owned and operated by the Austrian Federal Railways (ÖBB).

== Services ==
As of the December 2024 timetable change, the following regional train service calls at Altach station (the S1 is also part of Bodensee S-Bahn):

- WESTbahn green: one train per day and direction to Lindau-Insel and Wien Westbahnhof.
- Vorarlberg S-Bahn S1: half-hourly service between Bludenz and Bregenz Hafen, with some trains continuing to Lindau-Insel.

== See also ==
- Rail transport in Austria
