= Wolfurt =

- Municipality
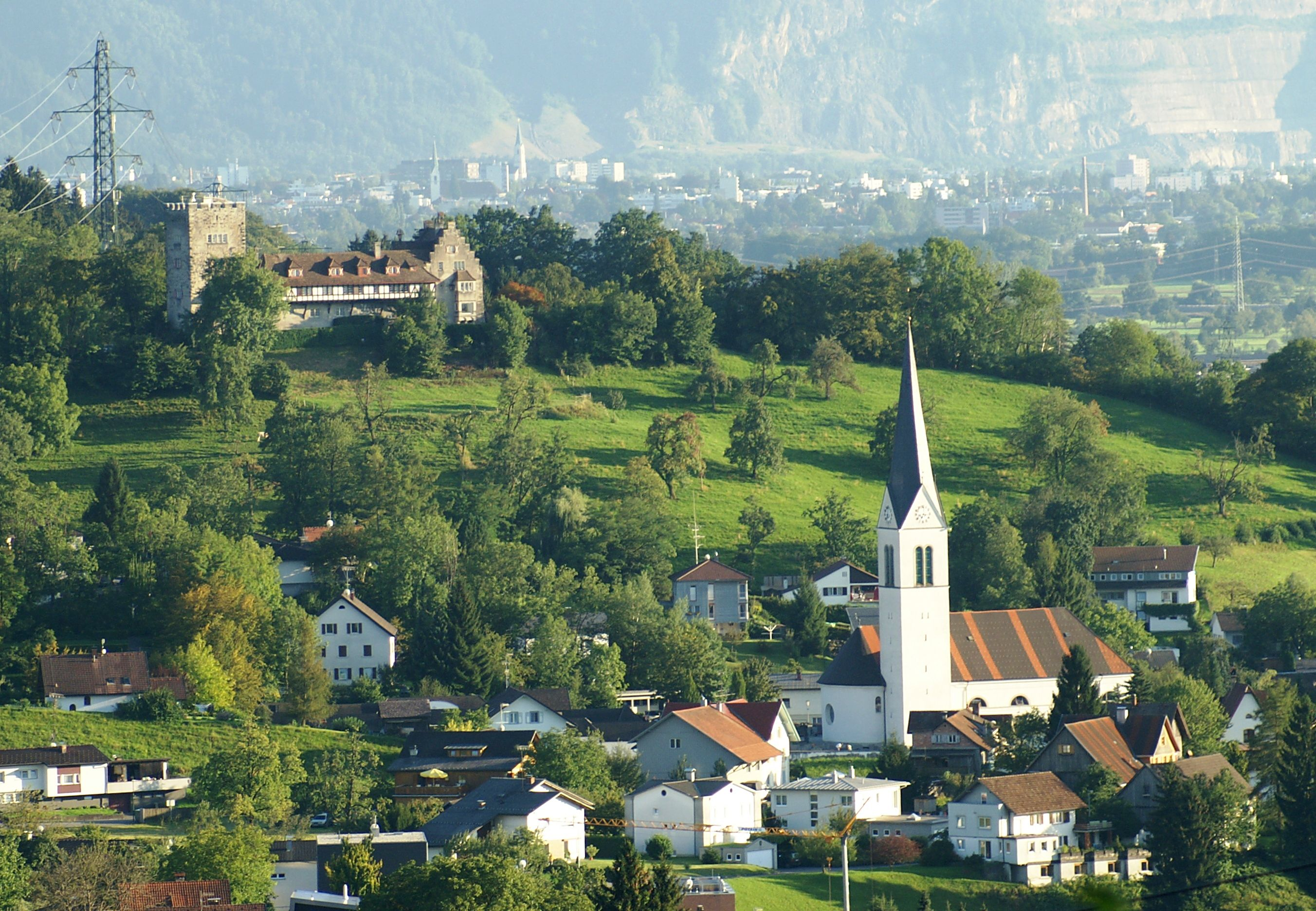

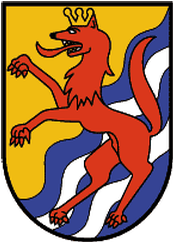
- Coat of arms

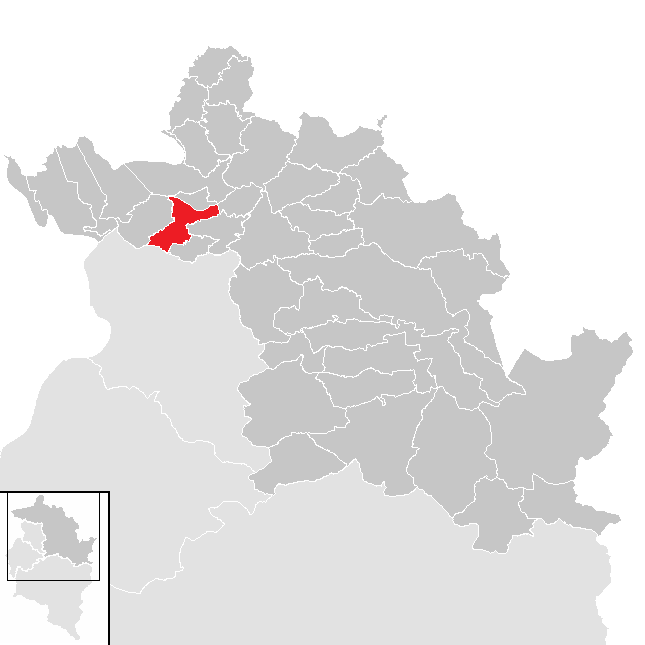
- Location in the district

- Location within Austria
- Coordinates: 47°28′23.08″N 09°45′14.11″E
- Country: Austria
- State: Vorarlberg
- District: Bregenz

Government
  - Mayor: Christian Natter (ÖVP)

Area
  - Total: 10 km^{2} (3.9 sq mi)
- Elevation: 434 m (1,424 ft)

Population (2018-01-01)
  - Total: 8,446
  - Density: 840/km^{2} (2,200/sq mi)
- Time zone: UTC+1 (CET)
  - Summer (DST): UTC+2 (CEST)
- Postal code: 6922, 6960 (Wolfurt-Bahnhof)
- Area code: 05574
- Vehicle registration: B
- Website: www.wolfurt.at

Wolfurt is a municipality in the western Austrian state of Vorarlberg.

== Population ==
Historical population
Year	Pop.	±%
1869	1,648	—
1880	1,623	−1.5%
1890	1,892	+16.6%
1900	2,070	+9.4%
1910	2,265	+9.4%
1923	1,798	−20.6%
1934	2,086	+16.0%
1939	2,179	+4.5%
1951	2,522	+15.7%
1961	3,391	+34.5%
1971	5,740	+69.3%
1981	6,589	+14.8%
1991	7,289	+10.6%
2001	7,849	+7.7%
2011	8,095	+3.1%
2016	8,331	+2.9%

== Transport ==
Wolfurt railway station is an intermediate stop on the Vorarlberg railway line (Vorarlbergbahn) traversing Vorarlberg in a north-south direction. This railway station is called at by the S1 and R5 regional train services of Vorarlberg S-Bahn, operated by Austrian Federal Railways (ÖBB).
