= Tisis railway station =

Railway station in Feldkirch, Vorarlberg

Tisis
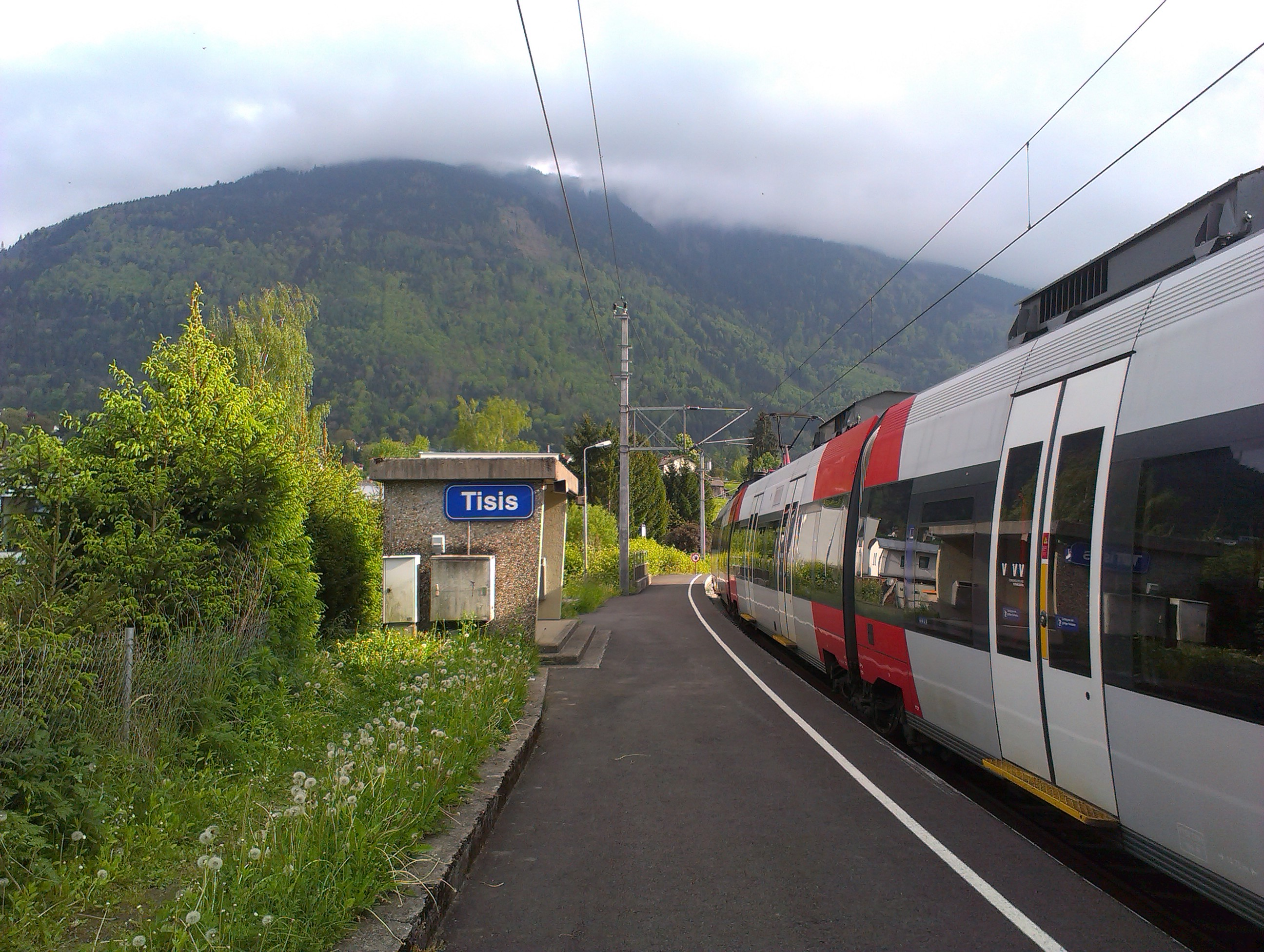

General information
- Location: Dorfstrasse 52, 6800 Tisis (Feldkirch); Austria
- Coordinates: 47°13′37.506″N 09°34′31.386″E
- Elevation: 452 m (AA)
- Owner: ÖBB
- Line: Feldkirch–Buchs
- Platforms: 1
- Tracks: 1

History
- Opened: 1872

Services
Preceding station	Vorarlberg S-Bahn	Following station
Nendeln towards Buchs SG	S2	Gisingen towards Feldkirch
Location
- Location within Austria Location within Vorarlberg

Tisis railway station is a railway station in the Tisis district of the town of Feldkirch in the westernmost Austrian Federal State of Vorarlberg. The station is located on the Feldkirch–Buchs railway line near the border to the Principality of Liechtenstein. It is served by regional trains only.

The station is owned and operated by Austrian Federal Railways (ÖBB). It is one of five stations in the city of Feldkirch. The others are Altenstadt, Feldkirch, Feldkirch Amberg and Gisingen.

The next station in direction to Buchs SG is Nendeln. Until 2013, it used to be Schaanwald, which is now closed.

== Services ==
As of the December 2023 timetable change, the following regional train service calls at the station:

- Vorarlberg S-Bahn S2: on weekdays, six trains per day to Buchs SG, eleven to Feldkirch

== See also ==
- Rail transport in Austria
