= Gisingen railway station =

Railway station in Feldkirch, Vorarlberg

Gisingen
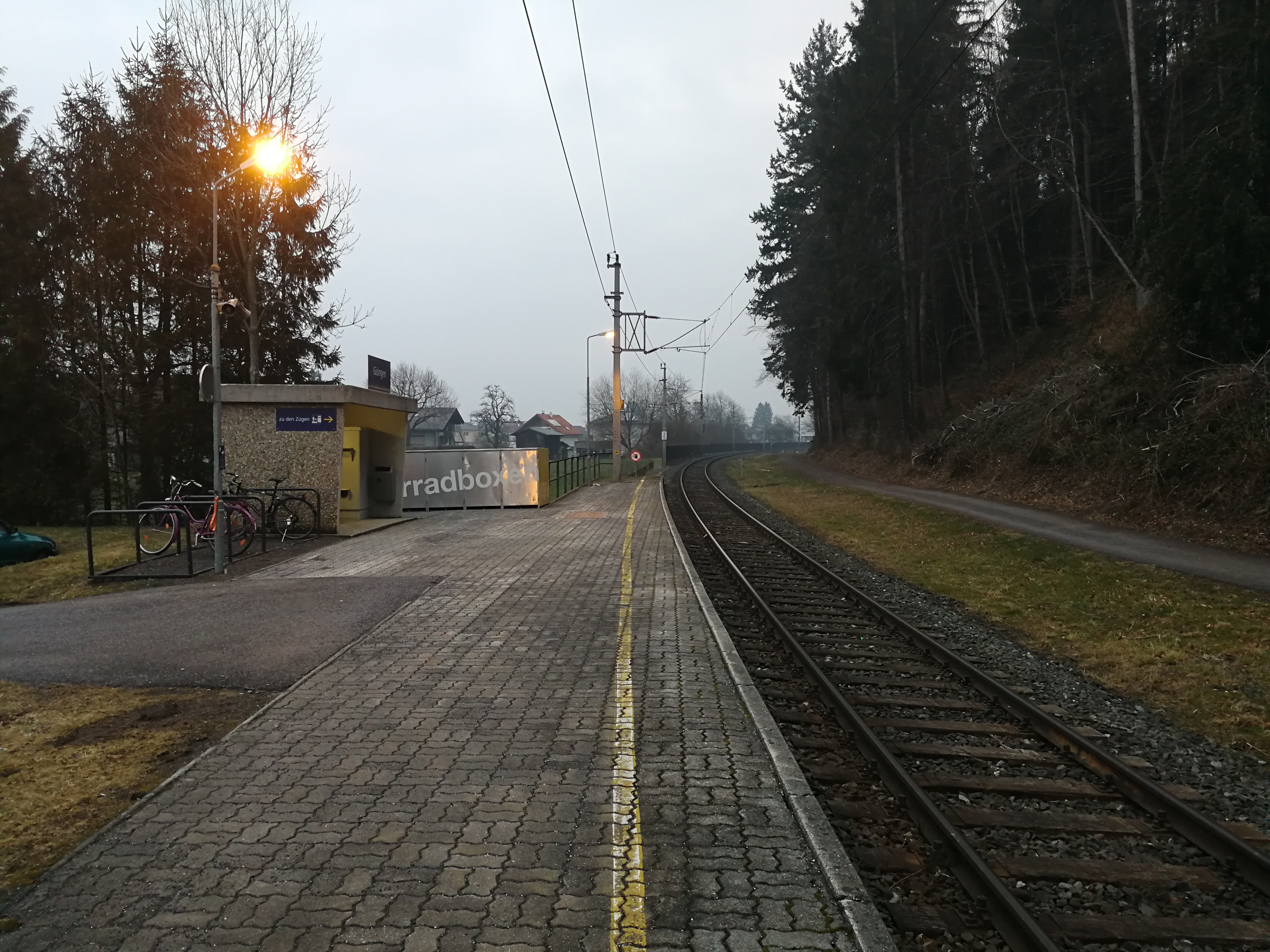

General information
- Location: Haltestellenweg 1, 6800 Gisingen (Feldkirch); Austria
- Coordinates: 47°15′20.6532″N 09°35′53.1024″E
- Elevation: 458 m (AA)
- Owner: ÖBB
- Line: Feldkirch–Buchs
- Platforms: 1
- Tracks: 1

History
- Opened: 1872

Services
Preceding station	Vorarlberg S-Bahn	Following station
Tisis towards Buchs SG	S2	Altenstadt towards Feldkirch
Location
- Location within Austria Location within Vorarlberg

Gisingen railway station is a railway station in the Gisingen district of the town of Feldkirch in the westernmost Austrian Federal State of Vorarlberg. The station is located on the Feldkirch–Buchs railway line and is served by regional trains only.

The station is owned and operated by Austrian Federal Railways (ÖBB). It is one of five stations in the city of Feldkirch. The others are Altenstadt, Feldkirch, Feldkirch Amberg and Tisis.

== Services ==
As of the December 2023 timetable change, the following regional train service calls at the station:

- Vorarlberg S-Bahn S2: on weekdays, six trains per day to Buchs SG, eleven to Feldkirch

== See also ==
- Rail transport in Austria
