= Klaus, Vorarlberg =

Klaus
- Municipality
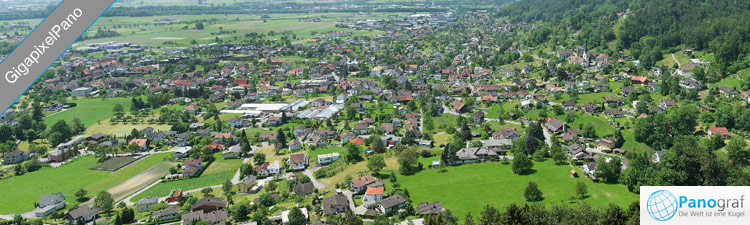

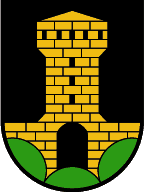
- Coat of arms

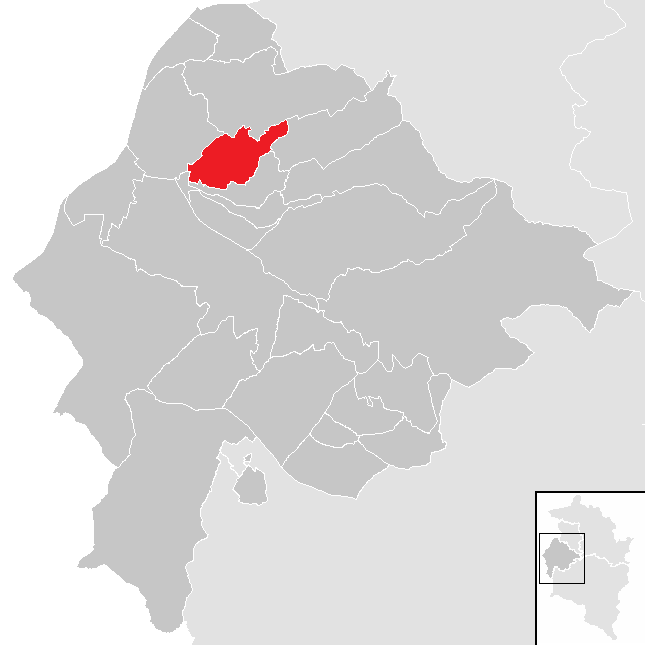
- Location in the district

- Location within Austria
- Coordinates: 47°18′31″N 09°38′48″E
- Country: Austria
- State: Vorarlberg
- District: Feldkirch

Government
  - Mayor: Werner Müller (ÖVP)

Area
  - Total: 5.25 km^{2} (2.03 sq mi)
- Elevation: 507 m (1,663 ft)

Population (2018-01-01)
  - Total: 3,118
  - Density: 594/km^{2} (1,540/sq mi)
- Time zone: UTC+1 (CET)
  - Summer (DST): UTC+2 (CEST)
- Postal code: 6833
- Area code: 05523
- Vehicle registration: FK
- Website: www.klaus.at

Klaus is a municipality in the district of Feldkirch in the Austrian state of Vorarlberg.

== Population ==
Historical population
Year	Pop.	±%
1869	596	—
1880	640	+7.4%
1890	667	+4.2%
1900	760	+13.9%
1910	862	+13.4%
1923	797	−7.5%
1934	892	+11.9%
1939	894	+0.2%
1951	1,023	+14.4%
1961	1,211	+18.4%
1971	2,064	+70.4%
1981	2,369	+14.8%
1991	2,465	+4.1%
2001	2,792	+13.3%
2011	3,075	+10.1%

== Transport ==
Klaus in Vorarlberg railway station is an intermediate station on the Vorarlberg railway line (Vorarlbergbahn) traversing Vorarlberg in a north–south direction. The railway station is called at by the S1 and R5 regional train services of Vorarlberg S-Bahn, operated by Austrian Federal Railways (ÖBB).
