= Schwarzach, Vorarlberg =

Schwarzach
- Municipality
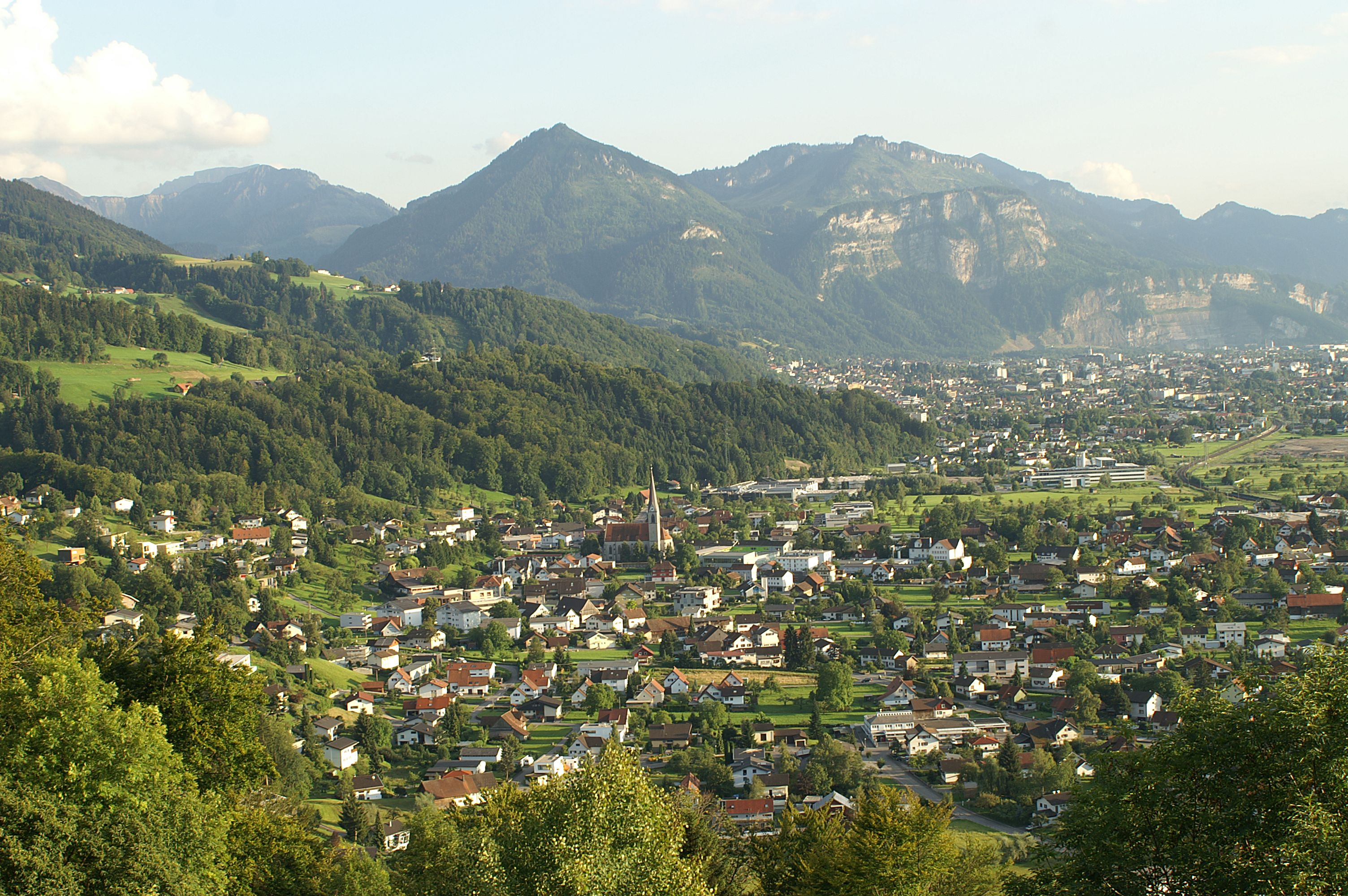

- Coat of arms

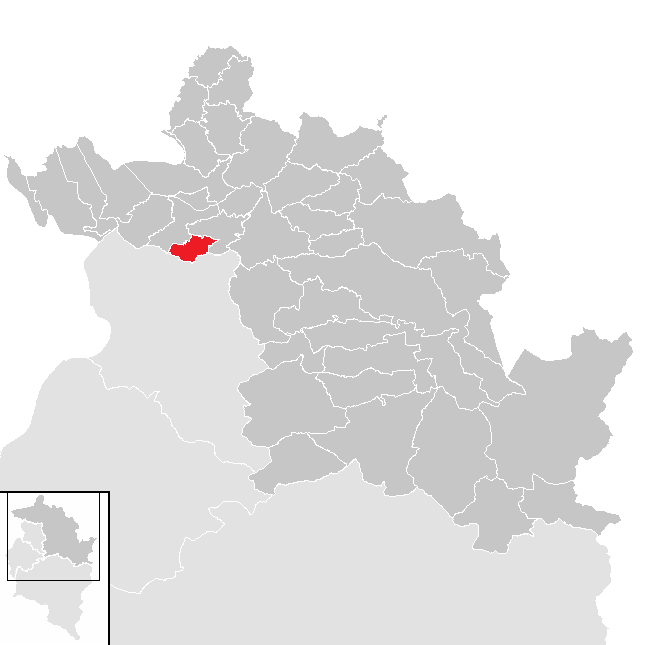
- Location in the district

- Location within Austria
- Coordinates: 47°25′00″N 09°45′00″E
- Country: Austria
- State: Vorarlberg
- District: Bregenz

Government
  - Mayor: Thomas Schierle (FÜR Schwarzach)

Area
  - Total: 4.91 km^{2} (1.90 sq mi)
- Elevation: 433 m (1,421 ft)

Population (2018-01-01)
  - Total: 3,949
  - Density: 804/km^{2} (2,080/sq mi)
- Time zone: UTC+1 (CET)
  - Summer (DST): UTC+2 (CEST)
- Postal code: 6858
- Area code: 05572
- Vehicle registration: B
- Website: www.schwarzach.at

Schwarzach (Austrian German pronunciation: [ˈʃvartsax]) is a municipality in the Austrian state of Vorarlberg.

== Population ==
Historical population
Year	Pop.	±%
1869	689	—
1880	800	+16.1%
1890	883	+10.4%
1900	995	+12.7%
1910	1,084	+8.9%
1923	967	−10.8%
1934	961	−0.6%
1939	967	+0.6%
1951	1,339	+38.5%
1961	1,780	+32.9%
1971	2,374	+33.4%
1981	3,084	+29.9%
1991	3,122	+1.2%
2001	3,373	+8.0%
2011	3,690	+9.4%

== Transport ==
Schwarzach in Vorarlberg railway station is an intermediate station on the Vorarlberg railway line (Vorarlbergbahn) traversing Vorarlberg in a north-south direction. The railway station is called at by the S1 and R5 regional train services of Vorarlberg S-Bahn, operated by Austrian Federal Railways (ÖBB).
