= Feldkirch railway station =

Railway station in Vorarlberg, Austria

Feldkirch
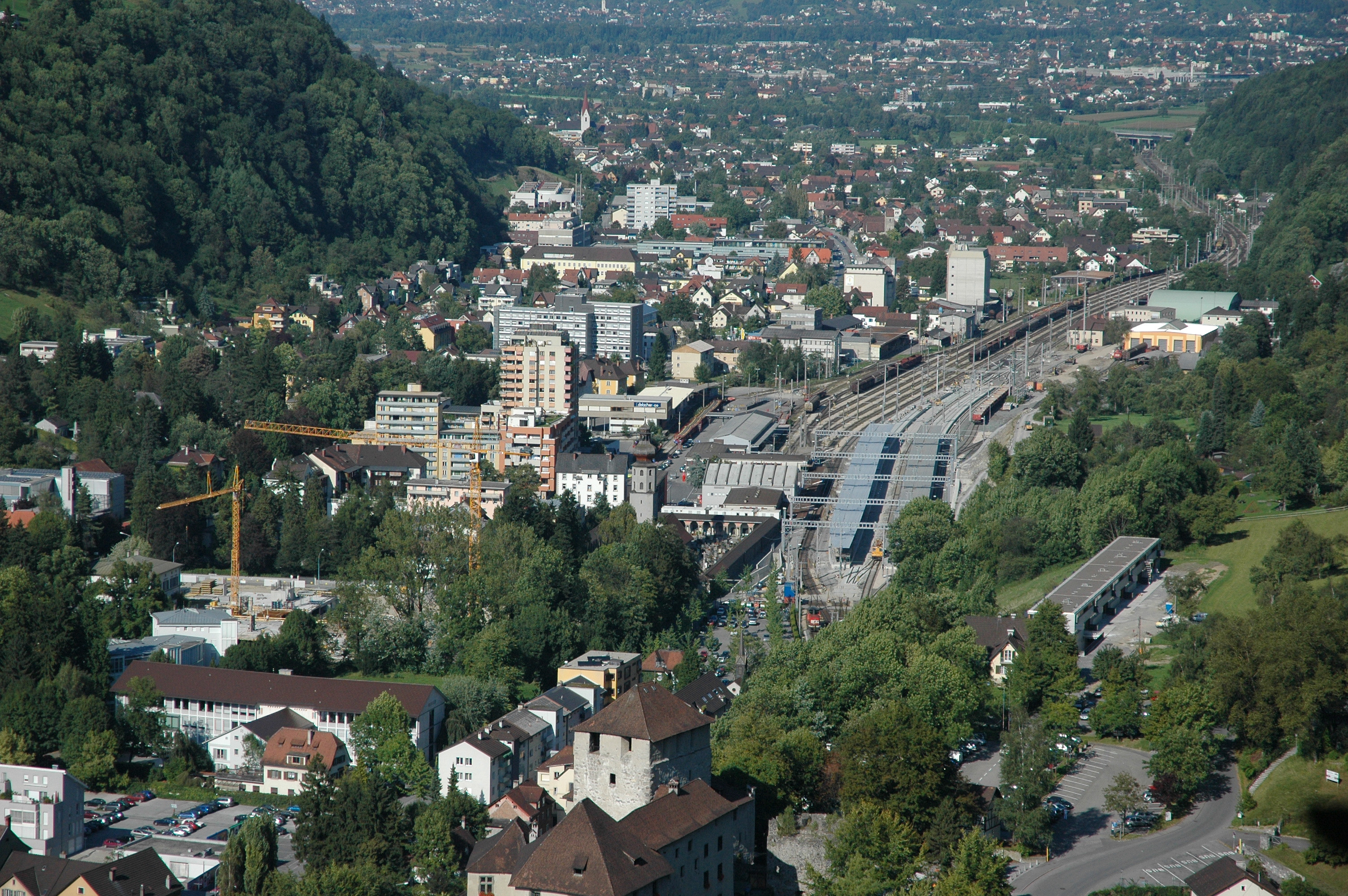
- View of the station and the site of the former wagon workshop.

General information
- Location: Bahnhofstraße; 6800 Feldkirch; Austria
- Coordinates: 47°14′28″N 09°36′15″E
- Elevation: 457 m (AA)
- Owner: Austrian Federal Railways (ÖBB)
- Operator: ÖBB, WESTbahn, DB
- Lines: Feldkirch–Buchs railway Vorarlberg railway
- Distance: 46.912 km (29.150 mi) from St. Margrethen

History
- Opened: 1 July 1872

Services
Preceding station	DB Fernverkehr	Following station
Dornbirn towards Dortmund Hbf	ICE 62 Bodensee	Bludenz towards Innsbruck Hbf
Preceding station	ÖBB	Following station
Dornbirn towards Frankfurt (Main) Hbf	Railjet Express	Bludenz towards Vienna Airport
Buchs SG towards Zürich HB	Railjet Express	Bludenz towards Vienna Airport
Buchs SG towards Zürich HB	Railjet Express	Bludenz towards Bratislava hl.st.
Buchs SG towards Zürich HB	Railjet Express	Bludenz towards Budapest Keleti
Dornbirn towards Bregenz	Nightjet	Bludenz towards Wien Hbf
Buchs SG towards Zürich HB	Nightjet	Bludenz towards Graz Hbf
Buchs SG towards Zürich HB	EuroNight	Bludenz towards Budapest Keleti
Buchs SG towards Zürich HB	EuroNight	Bludenz towards Praha hl.n.
Buchs SG towards Zürich HB	EuroNight	Bludenz towards Zagreb
Buchs SG towards Zürich HB	EuroCity (Transalpin)	Bludenz towards Graz Hbf
Frastanz towards Bludenz	REX 1	Rankweil towards Lindau-Insel
Preceding station		Following station
Rankweil toward Lindau-Insel	WESTbahn	Frastanz toward Wien Westbahnhof
Preceding station	Vorarlberg S-Bahn	Following station
Feldkirch Amberg towards Lindau-Insel	S1	Frastanz towards Bludenz
Altenstadt towards Buchs SG	S2	Terminus
Rankweil towards St. Margrethen	R5	Terminus
Location
- Location within Austria Location within Vorarlberg

Feldkirch railway station (German: Bahnhof Feldkirch) serves the city of Feldkirch, in the Feldkirch district of the Austrian federal state of Vorarlberg. Opened in 1872, it forms the junction between the Vorarlberg railway and the Feldkirch–Buchs railway.

The station, which is owned and operated by the Austrian Federal Railways (ÖBB), is the largest in Feldkirch. Other railway stations within the city limits are Altenstadt, Feldkirch Amberg, Gisingen and Tisis.

== Location ==
Feldkirch railway station is situated in Bahnhofplatz, in the northern Feldkirch district of Levis, between the Ardetzenberg and the Känzele.

== History ==
The station was opened on 1 July 1872, together with the rest of the Vorarlberg railway. The original station building was repeatedly extended from 1884, as the Arlberg railway transformed Feldkirch into an international transport hub.

In the 1960s, the original station building was torn down. In early 1969, the new building was put into operation.

Between 1999 and 2001, the station was renovated and rebuilt again, as part of the ÖBB-Bahnhofsinitiative. The renovation work included replacement of the platforms, the pedestrian underpass and the station building.

In 2010, in a survey conducted by the Verkehrsclub Österreich (VCÖ), the station was nominated by the interviewed passengers as the sixth most beautiful railway station in Austria.

== Services ==
Feldkirch is one of Vorarlberg's major railway stations. It also serves as a loading station for the motorail train from Feldkirch to Vienna, Graz and Villach. Additionally, it is served by Railjet and other long-distance trains as well as regional train services of Vorarlberg S-Bahn, with some services also operating for Bodensee S-Bahn.

Feldkirch is the border station of the line to Buchs SG (Switzerland) and it is the only Austrian border station adjacent to the Principality of Liechtenstein. It is also situated on the Vorarlberg line, which continues northwards to Lindau-Insel in Germany.

As of the December 2024 timetable change, the following regional train services exist (the S1 and R5 are both also part of Bodensee S-Bahn):

- EuroCity (EC) / Railjet (RJ/RJX):
  - EC Transalpin: daily service between Zurich HB and Graz.
- Intercity-Express ICE 62: one train-pair per day between Dortmund Hbf and Innsbruck Hbf.
- EuroNight (EN) / Nightjet (NJ):
  - NJ: daily overnight trains between Bregenz/Zurich HB and Wien Hbf.
  - EN: daily overnight trains between Zurich HB and Budapest, Prague or Zagreb
- WESTbahn green: one train per day and direction to Lindau-Insel and Wien Westbahnhof.
- REX 1: trains between Bludenz and Lindau-Insel.
- Vorarlberg S-Bahn:
  - S1: half-hourly service between Bludenz and Bregenz Hafen, with some trains continuing to Lindau-Insel.
  - S2: on weekdays, twelve trains per day to Buchs SG.
  - R5: on weekdays, three trains per day to St. Margrethen.

== Customs ==
Feldkirch station is, for customs purposes, a border station for passengers arriving from Liechtenstein and Switzerland. As such, checks may be performed in the station by Austrian customs officials. Systematic passport controls were reduced when Switzerland joined the Schengen Area in 2008 and later scrapped when Liechtenstein joined in 2011.

== Notable visitors ==
=== James Joyce ===
Irish writer James Joyce paid a visit to Feldkirch in 1932 to see his friend Eugene Jolas. During the visit, he said to Jolas, "Over there, on those tracks, the fate of Ulysses was decided in 1915." Since Bloomsday 1994, the quote has been displayed in German translation in the station concourse.

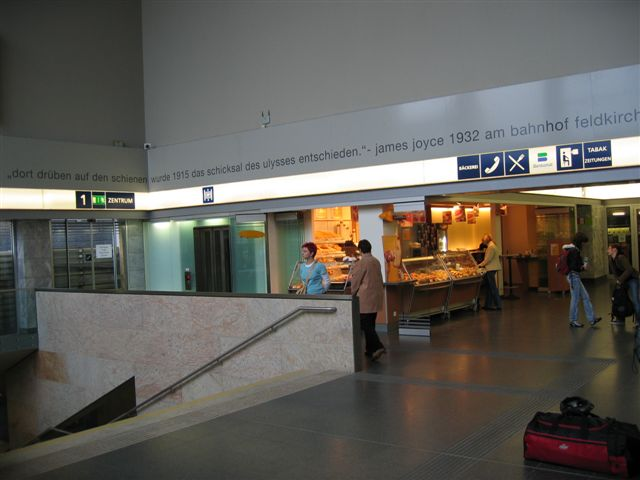
James Joyce quote display in the Feldkirch station concourse.

Joyce had travelled through Feldkirch by train in 1915. Due to World War I, he had been considered an "enemy alien" in his then home town of Trieste, which, at that time, was part of Austria-Hungary. Thanks to influential friends, he had obtained permission to leave Austria-Hungary, with his partner Nora Barnacle and their two shared children, and travel to Zürich. Meanwhile, his brother Stanislaus Joyce was arrested in Trieste and detained until the end of the war.

During border control checks at Feldkirch, the train on which Joyce and Barnacle were travelling was boarded, and passengers inspected by officials; Joyce escaped arrest by a whisker. If Joyce had been arrested then, he would have been unable to write Ulysses in its present form, hence his comment to Jolas.

At the end of 2001, the ÖBB replaced a plaque mounted by the Feldkirch culture circle above the ticket counters on Bloomsday 1994 with a more conspicuous presentation of the Joycean literary quotation.

=== Stefan Zweig ===
In his memoirs The World of Yesterday (German: Die Welt von Gestern), the Austrian writer Stefan Zweig explained that on 24 March 1919 he had been an eyewitness at Feldkirch railway station, as Charles I of Austria was deported from the Republic of German Austria into exile in Switzerland:

Upon returning to Austria via the border station at Feldkirch an unforgettable experience stood before me. Even getting out I had noticed a strange unrest in the border guards and policemen. A bell tolled to signal the approach of a train. The policemen stood, all railway officials rushed out of their boxes. Slowly, majestically, the train rolled in, a special kind of train, a Salon train. The locomotive stopped. A motion was palpable through the ranks of those waiting, I still did not know why. Then I saw behind the mirror glass of the coach an erect Emperor Karl, the last Emperor of Austria and his black-clad wife, Empress Zita. I was startled: the last Emperor of Austria, heir to the Habsburg dynasty, which ruled the country for seven hundred years, was leaving his kingdom! As he had refused formally to abdicate, the republic had forced his departure. Now the high serious man stood at the window and saw for the last time the mountains, the houses, the people of his country. ... (Note: The truth of this anecdote has since been questioned by biographers of Stefan Zweig: "Zweig asserts in The World of Yesterday that on 24 March 1919 he was an eyewitness in Feldkirch to the historically gratifying moment when Karl and Zita of Habsburg were deported from the Republic of Austria to Switzerland. However, Zweig biographers mistrust this now famous eyewitness account, because neither Zweig, nor his then girlfriend and later wife Friderike Winternitz, who was accompanying him, had ever mentioned or recorded the inherent sensation anywhere before. Zweig first mentioned his story, often since quoted as an historical eyewitness account, in The World of Yesterday, written decades later. Friderike Winternitz, also active as a journalist and writer, similarly first mentioned the legendary anecdote even later than the "Second World War", in her Zweig biography, after learning, in Zweig's "World of Yesterday", of what both of them had (supposedly) seen in Feldkirch. Weigel, Andreas. "Am James Joyce und Stefan Zweig (Rohbericht)". James James-Joyce-Austriaca · James Joyce und Österreich (in German). Yahoo Deutschland Groups.)

— Stefan Zweig, The World of Yesterday, Stockholm: Bermann-Fischer Verlag AB, 1942

== See also ==
- Rail transport in Austria
- Transport in Austria
