= Navara =

Navara may refer to:

== People ==
- Navara (poacher) (born c. 1977), Mozambican convict
- David Navara (born 1985), Czech chess grandmaster
- Luděk Navara (born 1964), Czech historian and publicist
- Paval Navara (1927–1983), British-Belarusian figure

== Other uses ==
- Nissan Navara, a line of pickup truck (since 1985)
- Navara, part of software company RAM Mobile Data
- Navara rice, a crop variety

== See also ==
- Navarra
- Anna Navarre, of the Major Deus Ex characters
- Novara (disambiguation)
