= Slovakia–United Kingdom relations =

- Slovakia: United Kingdom

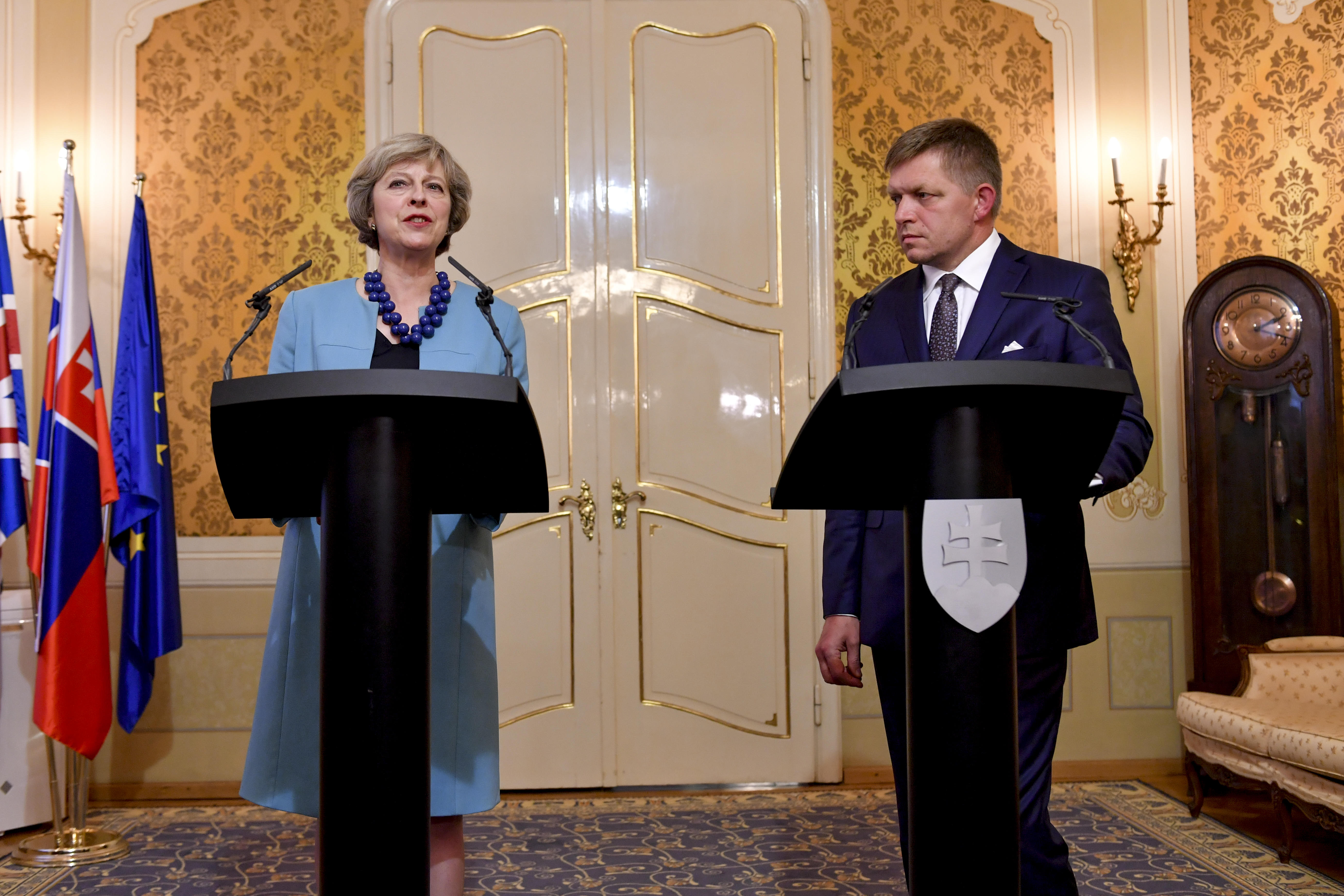
British Prime Minister Theresa May with Slovak Prime Minister Robert Fico in Bratislava, July 2016.

Slovakia–United Kingdom relations encompass the diplomatic, economic, and historical interactions between the Slovak Republic and the United Kingdom of Great Britain and Northern Ireland. Both countries established diplomatic relations on 1 January 1993.

Both countries share common membership of the Council of Europe, the European Court of Human Rights, the International Criminal Court, NATO, the OECD, the OSCE, the United Nations, and the World Trade Organization. The United Kingdom gave full support to Slovakia's membership in the European Union and NATO.

== History ==
After the declaration of independence of the Slovak State on March 14, 1939, the United Kingdom did not issue recognition of the new state. But on May 4, 1939 the British government requested that Peter Pares, previously British consul in the Sudetenland, be recognized as the British consul in Bratislava. On May 15, 1939 Richard Butler stated to the House of Commons that the move constituted a de facto recognition of the Slovak State. The Slovak State sent Milan A. P. Harminc to London as its consul-general. However, after the German invasion of Poland on September 1, 1939 Harminc and the Slovak ambassador in Warsaw Ladislav Szathmáry protested against the Slovak participation in the assault and subordinated themselves to Edvard Beneš' Czechoslovak government-in-exile.

The two countries ratified an air services agreement in 2004.

In July 2025, the Slovakian government under Robert Fico accused the United Kingdom Foreign, Commonwealth and Development Office of paying influencers to boost the Progressive Slovakia party during the 2023 Slovak parliamentary election, citing a report by investigative website Declassified UK. The United Kingdom denied efforts to influence the election and stated that the activity was aimed at boosting youth turnout regardless of party.

== Economic relations ==
Following Brexit, Trade between the United Kingdom and Belgium has been governed by the EU–UK Trade and Cooperation Agreement since 1 January 2021.

The two countries signed a bilateral investment agreement on 10 July 1990. The agreement entered force on 26 October 1990, but was later terminated on 1 July 2021.

Bilaterally the two countries have a Double Taxation Convention.

== Resident diplomatic missions ==
- Slovakia maintains an embassy in London.
- The United Kingdom is accredited to Slovakia through its embassy in Bratislava.
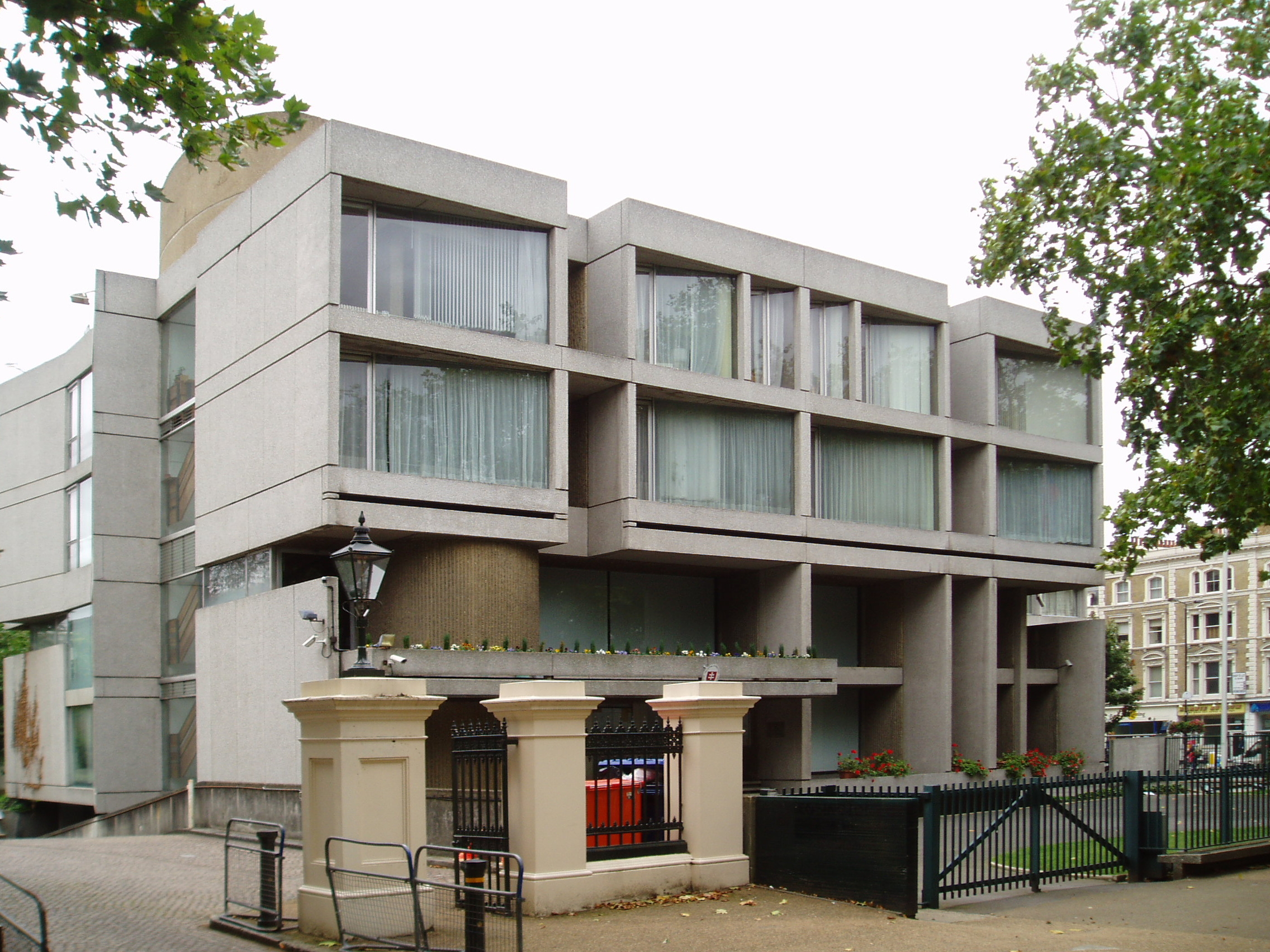
Embassy of Slovakia in London

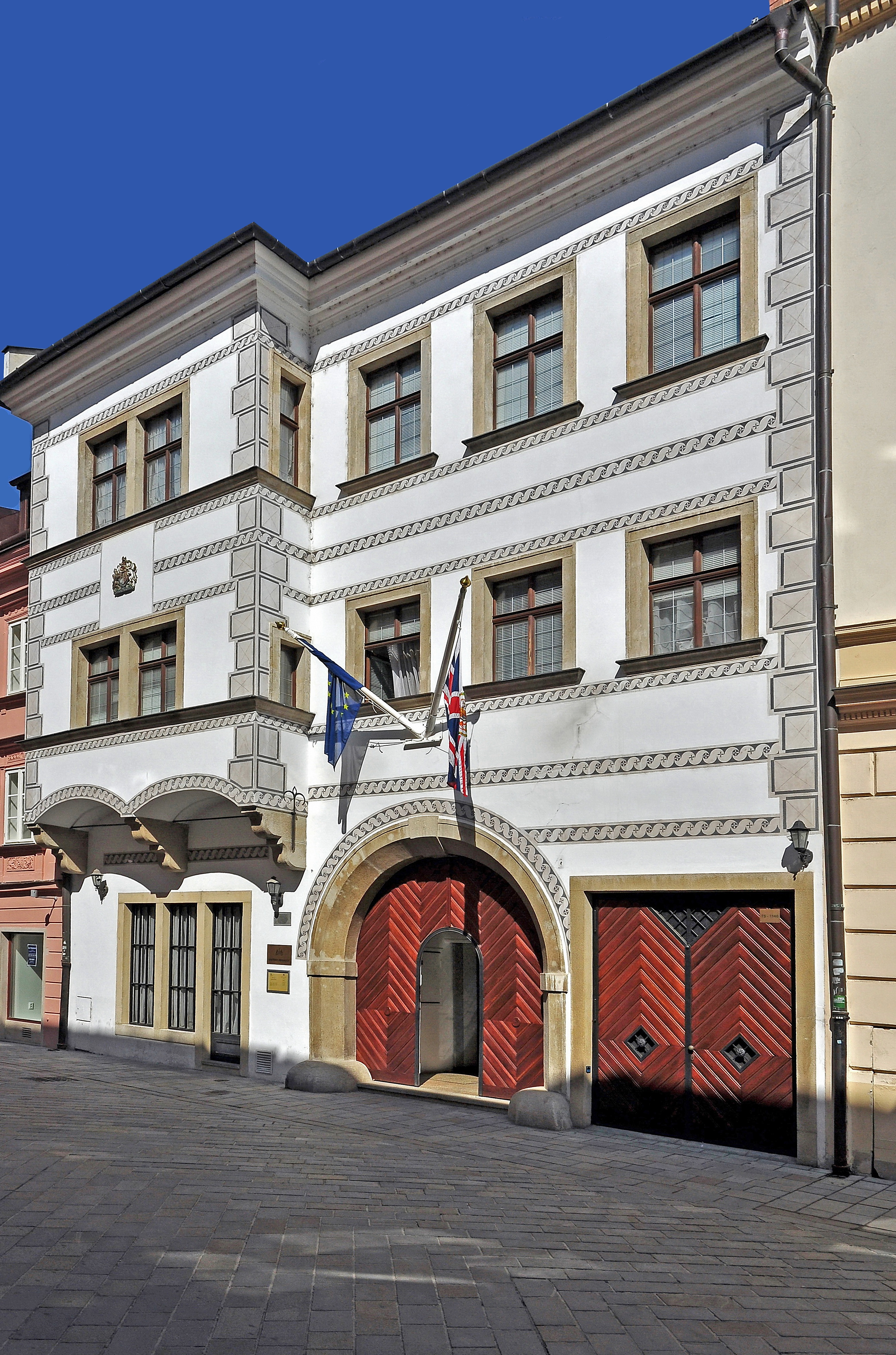
Embassy of the United Kingdom in Bratislava

== See also ==
- EU–UK Trade and Cooperation Agreement
- Foreign relations of Slovakia
- Foreign relations of the United Kingdom
