= Zdeněk Fránek =

Czech architect (born 1961)

Zdenek Franek
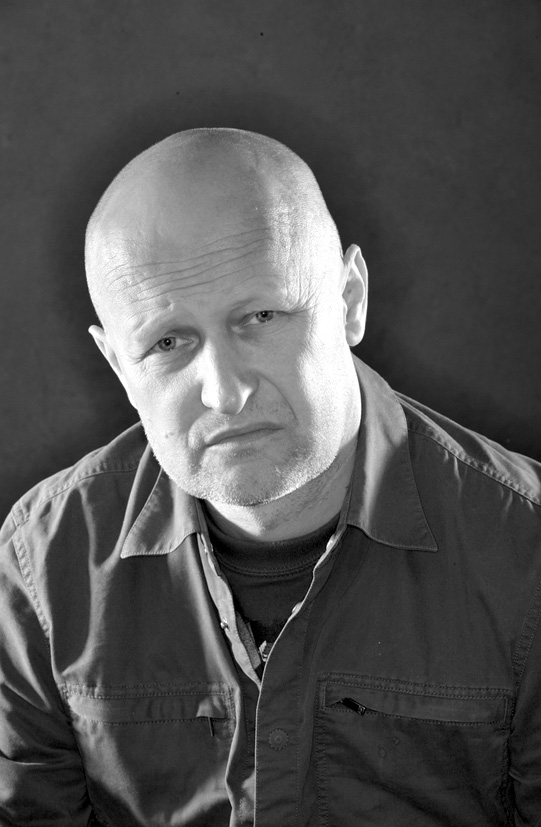
- Born: 26. August 1961; Boskovice

Zdeněk Fránek (born 26 August 1961 in Boskovice, Czechoslovakia) is a Czech architect and dean of the Faculty of Architecture at Technical University of Liberec. Fránek designs, publishes and teaches in the Czech Republic and abroad. He has given lectures for students and professionals at universities in the Czech Republic (AVU, VŠUP, ČVUT, KU, VUT Brno, V3B Ostrava, UTB Zlín etc.), Gent, Utrecht, Hildesheim, New Delhi and elsewhere.

== Studies ==
1980–1985 Faculty of architecture, Technical University of Brno, Czechoslovakia

== Professional experience ==
From 1986 to 1989 Fránek worked in the Department of the Chief Architect of Blansko. He established a private practice in 1989, and from 1994 to 1996 he was a guest lecturer at the Faculty of Architecture of Brno University of Technology. He taught at the Technical University of Ostrava, from 2008 to 2009, and the Architectural Institute In Prague from 2011 to 2012. He has also taught at the Technical University in Liberec since 2006, as well as having habilitation at the Academy of Fine Arts, Prague since 2008. Since 2011 he has been a professor at the Academy of Arts, Architecture and Design in Prague, and dean of the Faculty of Architecture at Technical University in Liberec since 2012.

== Exhibitions ==
Perspectives, Jaroslav Frágner Gallery in Prague (2007), Bowels of Architecture, Brno House of Arts (2011–2012), CCC Gallery, Beijing (2012), KILL YOUR IDOL (Zabij svého Fuchse) - Psychoanalysis of Contemporary Architecture of the City of Brno - 4AM Brno 2011, Czech and Slovak pavillon at the 13. International Architecture Exhibition of la Biennale di Venezia 2012, Kunstverein Leipzig 2013 Other independent exhibitions in the following towns: Boskovice, Blansko, Zlín, Pelhřimov, Gent, Utrecht, Hildesheim, Vienna.

In 2016 Fránek executed one of the late artist Jan Kubíček's designs for a large object, which was then installed and unveiled as a Kubíček memorial at a public park in Kubíček's birthplace, Kolín, opposite the city's Jan Hus memorial.

== Gallery ==
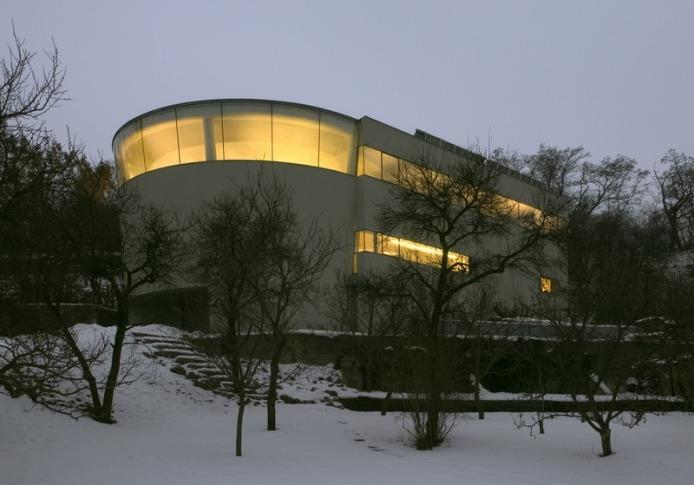
Family House on Červený kopec (Red Hill – Brno)

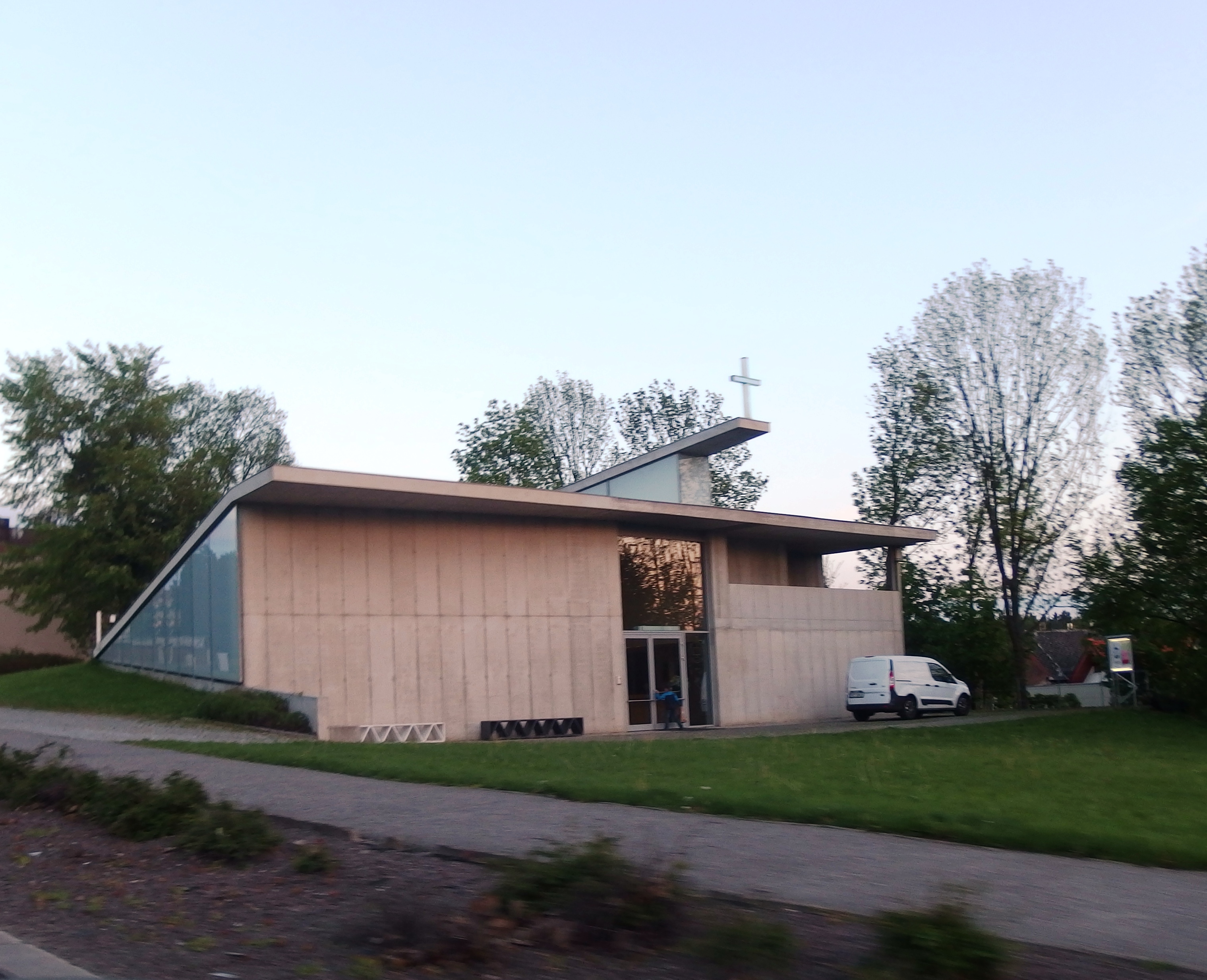
House of Prayer for Czech Brethren in Litomyšl

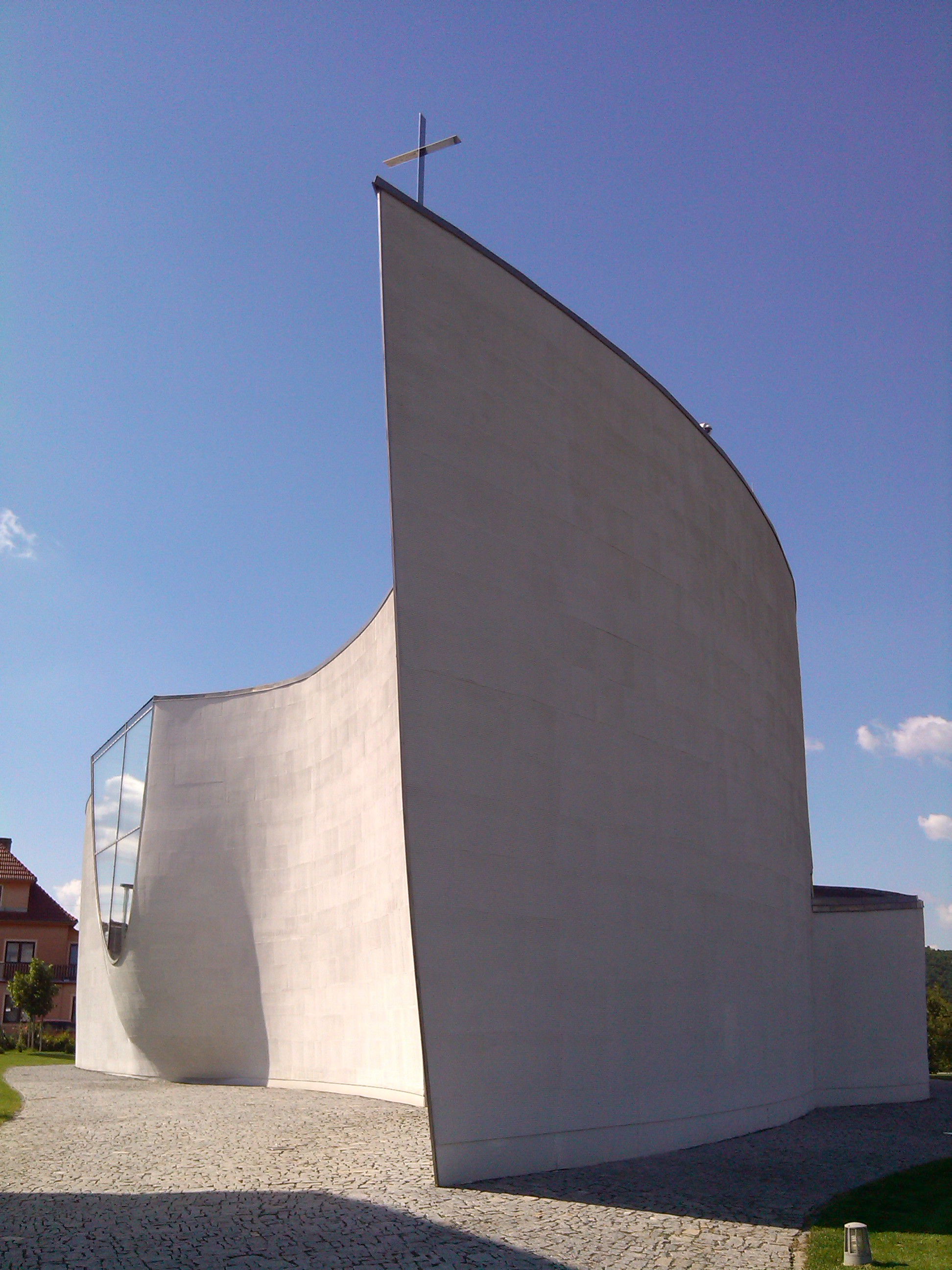
House of Prayer for Czech Brethren in Prague

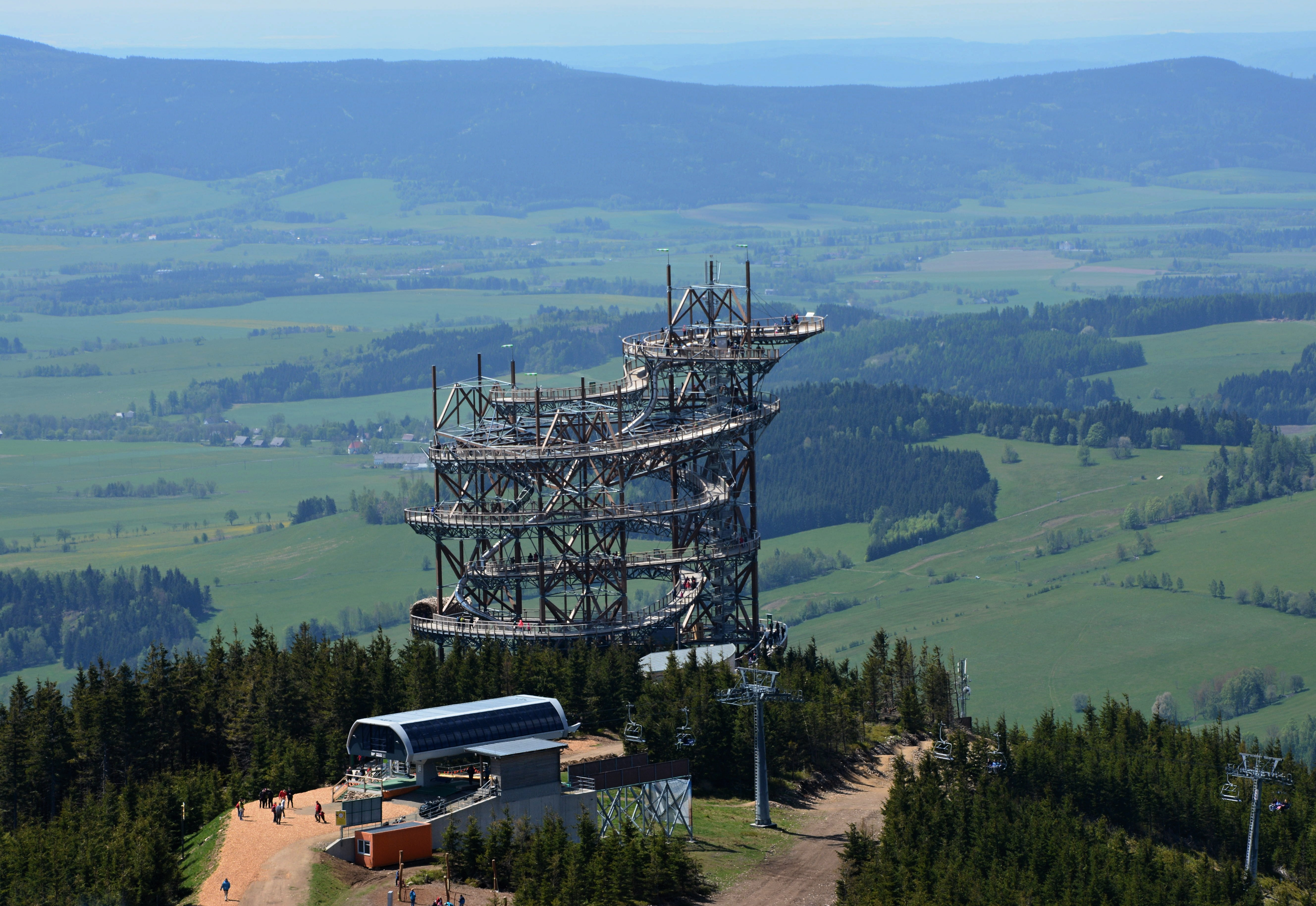
Tower in the clouds, View of Dolní Morava

== Projects ==
Family House on Červený kopec (Red Hill – Brno), design 1998, completion 1998–2004
House with a Studio in Kamenná Street Brno, multifunctional house, design 1997–1998, completion 1999–2005
House of Prayer for Czech Brethren in Litomyšl, church, design 2007, project 2008–2009
House of Prayer for Czech Brethren in Prague, church, design 2007, project 2008-2009
Gymnasium in Jaroměřice, civic building, design 2003, completion 2004
Chateau in Velké Opatovice – building implementation, Velké Opatovice, civic building, design 1998, completion 1992–2007
Czech China Center, gallery, design, 2010, completion 2011-2012/13
Chateau Kačina – interiors and exhibition space, Kačina, civic building, design 2007–2008, project 2008, completion 2010
Mixed-use House Eucon, Prague, multifunctional house, design 2002, completion 2003–2005
Family House in Ráječko, design 2007, completion 2008–2009
Family House in Plzeň / Family House Kriegerbeck in Plzeň, design 2006, completion 2008
Family House in Prague / Concrete House, Prague, design 2000, completion 2005
Vila beneath Chochola Brno, family house, design 2003, completion 2004–2006
Family House in Hodonín, design 1994, completion 1995–1998
Imposing Pavilion Vítkovice, Ostrava, civic building, design 2007, project 2007–2009, realization 2010
Energy Exchange No. 6 Ostrava – Vítkovice, reconstruction, design 2010, project 2010
The Invisible Tower in Litomyšl town, design 2012, completion 2012

== Sources ==
Zdeněk Fránek, Stavby/Buildings, Brno 2007, ISBN 978-80-239-9354-7
http://archiweb.cz/architects.php?action=show&type=arch&id=646
