= Vladimír List =

Czech engineer and academic (1877–1971)

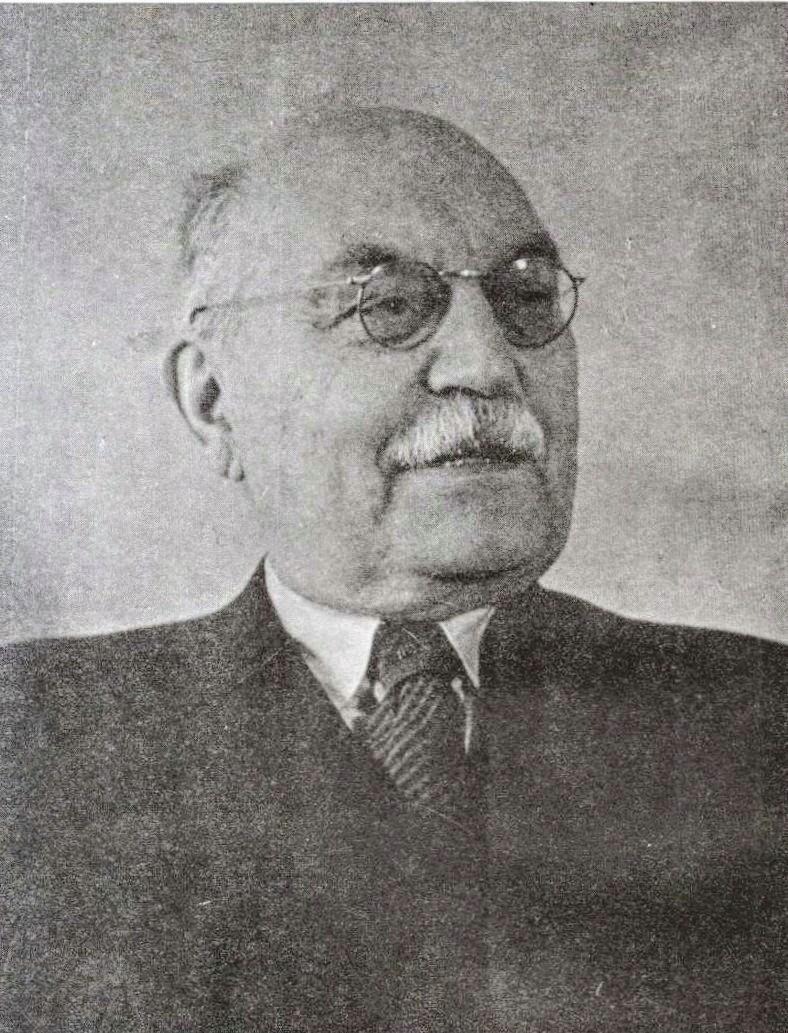
Portrait of Vladimír List

Vladimír List (4 June 1877 – 27 May 1971) was a Czech electrical engineer, scientist and university teacher. He was active in area of technical standardization.

== Lide and career ==
List was born on 4 June 1877 in Prague. From 1895 to 1899, he had studied mechanical engineering at the Czech Technical University in Prague but became interested in electrotechnics. In 1900 and 1901 he studied it at the Montefiore Institute in Liège, Belgium. After return he became chief designer in František Křižík's company where he worked on problems of electrification of railways and the industry (1902–08). In 1904 he married Helena Gebauerová, daughter of bohemist Jan Gebauer. In 1908 List became professor at the Czech Technical University in Brno (during 1917–1918 he served as its rector).

In 1910 he helped to set up specialised magazine Elektrotechnický obzor, in 1913 he participated on systematic electrification of Moravia and convinced the authorities of necessity to build public high-voltage transmission lines. In 1926 he proposed construction of Prague Metro, not realized at the time.

Since 1926, he was editor of book series Technický průvodce – Elektrotechnika (Technical Guide - Electrotechnics). He had written about 600 publications, many of them textbooks (well known were Základy elektrotechniky I and II).

After communist takeover in Czechoslovakia in 1948, List was sent to pension but he still published (his last article for magazine "Elektrotechnický obzor" was written in 1970 when he was 93 years old). List died on 27 May 1971 in Brno, at the age of 94.

== Technical standardization ==
ESČ logo

Vladimír List was very active in the field of technical standardization (normalisation). In 1919 he was one of founders of Czechoslovak Electrotechnical Federation (Elektrotechnický svaz československý, ESČ) whose president he was during 1920–1921. The ESČ logo is used until today.

In 1923, List was co-founder of Czechoslovak Normalisation Society (Československá normalizační společnost, ČSN). This organisation at first dealt with electrotechnics, then mechanical engineering and other industries adopted its goals. Later, ČSN standards became official.

In 1926, he co-founded, later served as a vice-chairman and during 1932-34 as a chairman of the international standards organization ISA (later ISO) in Basel, Switzerland.

List had initiated work on conversion tables between metric system and Imperial units.

His was successful in effort to standardize voltages for transmission lines in Czechoslovakia in 1919 (220/380V for low voltage and 22kV/100kV for high-voltage lines) and power plug sockets.

== Importance ==
List had helped to establish very high level of technical standardisation in Czechoslovakia and this level was kept even over communist era. He was interested and participated in wide array of activities, in spite of chronic health problems.

Today, a building in technological park and a student dormitory in Brno are named after List. A small plaque in Prague Metro station "Muzeum" is dedicated to him.
