= Petr Hlaváček =

Czech shoe expert (1950–2014)

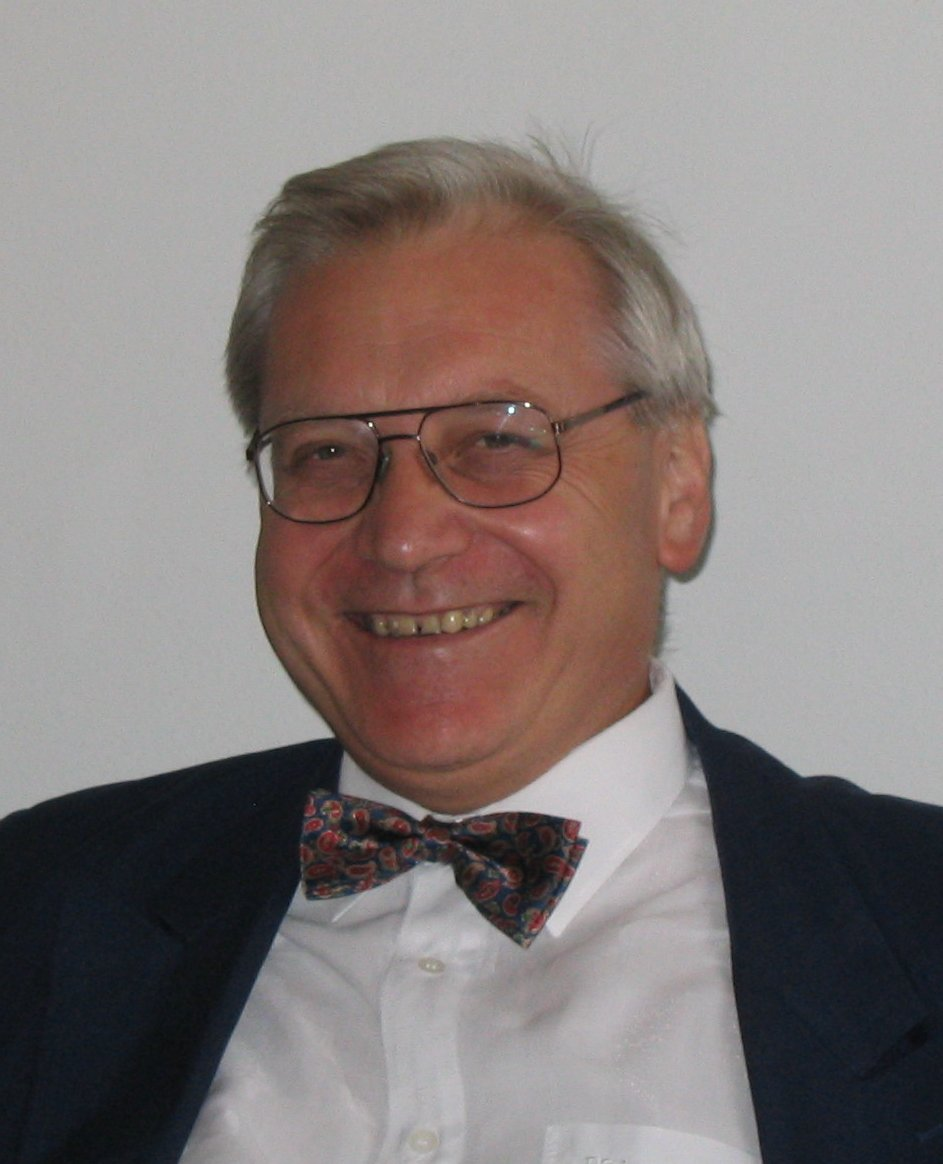
- Hlaváček in 2003
- Born: 23 February 1950; Boršice, Czechoslovakia
- Died: 10 January 2014 (aged 63); Uherské Hradiště, Czech Republic
- Education: Tomas Bata University in Zlín
- Known for: shoe technology, diabetic shoes, footwear history
- Scientific career
- Fields: Shoe making

Petr Hlaváček (February 23, 1950 – January 10, 2014) was a Czech shoe expert, university lecturer and researcher. His professional focus was to study the preparation and production of shoe materials, footwear, footwear ergonomics (especially for diabetics) and historical footwear.

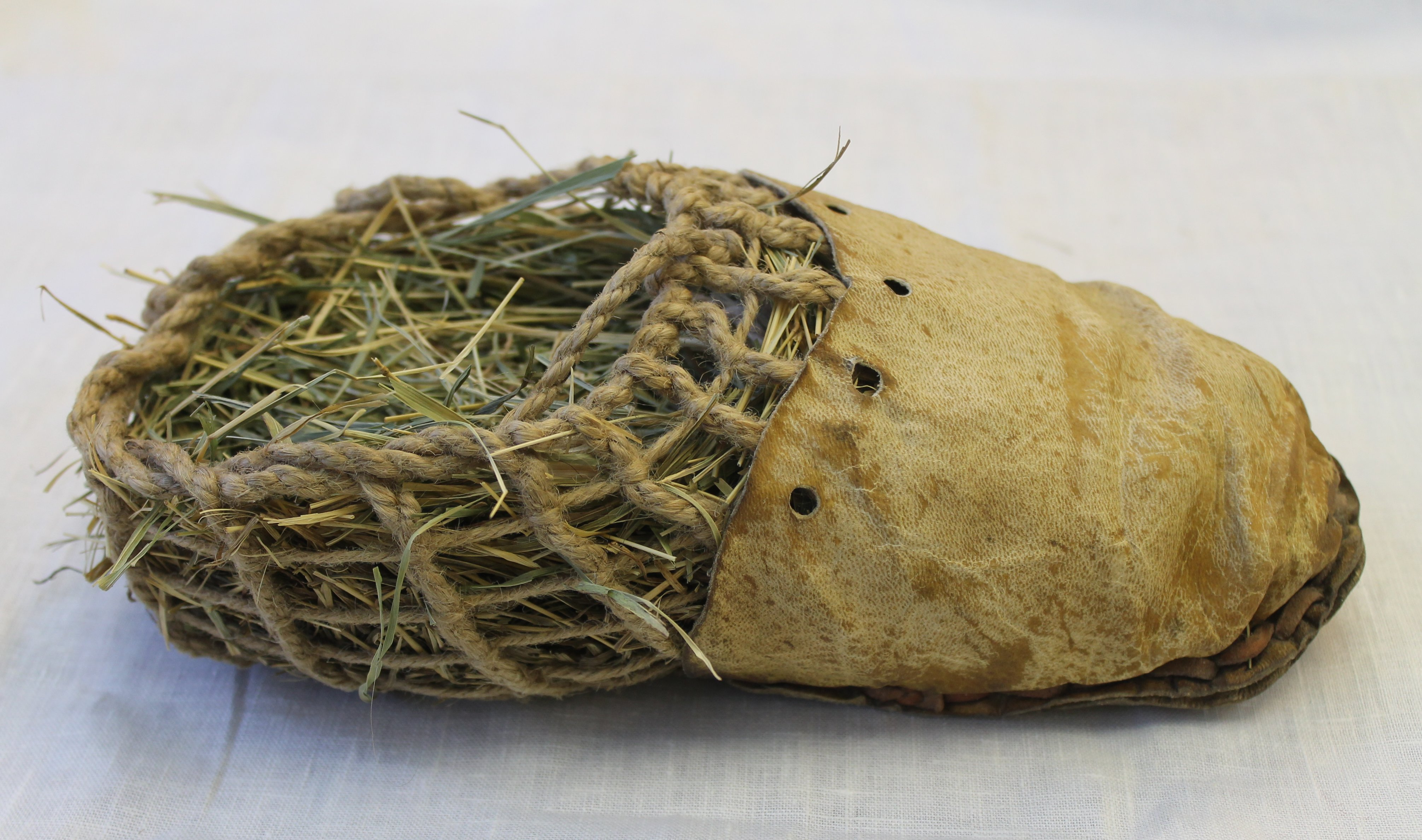
Replica of about 5000 years old Ötzi - The Iceman footwear found in Alpes

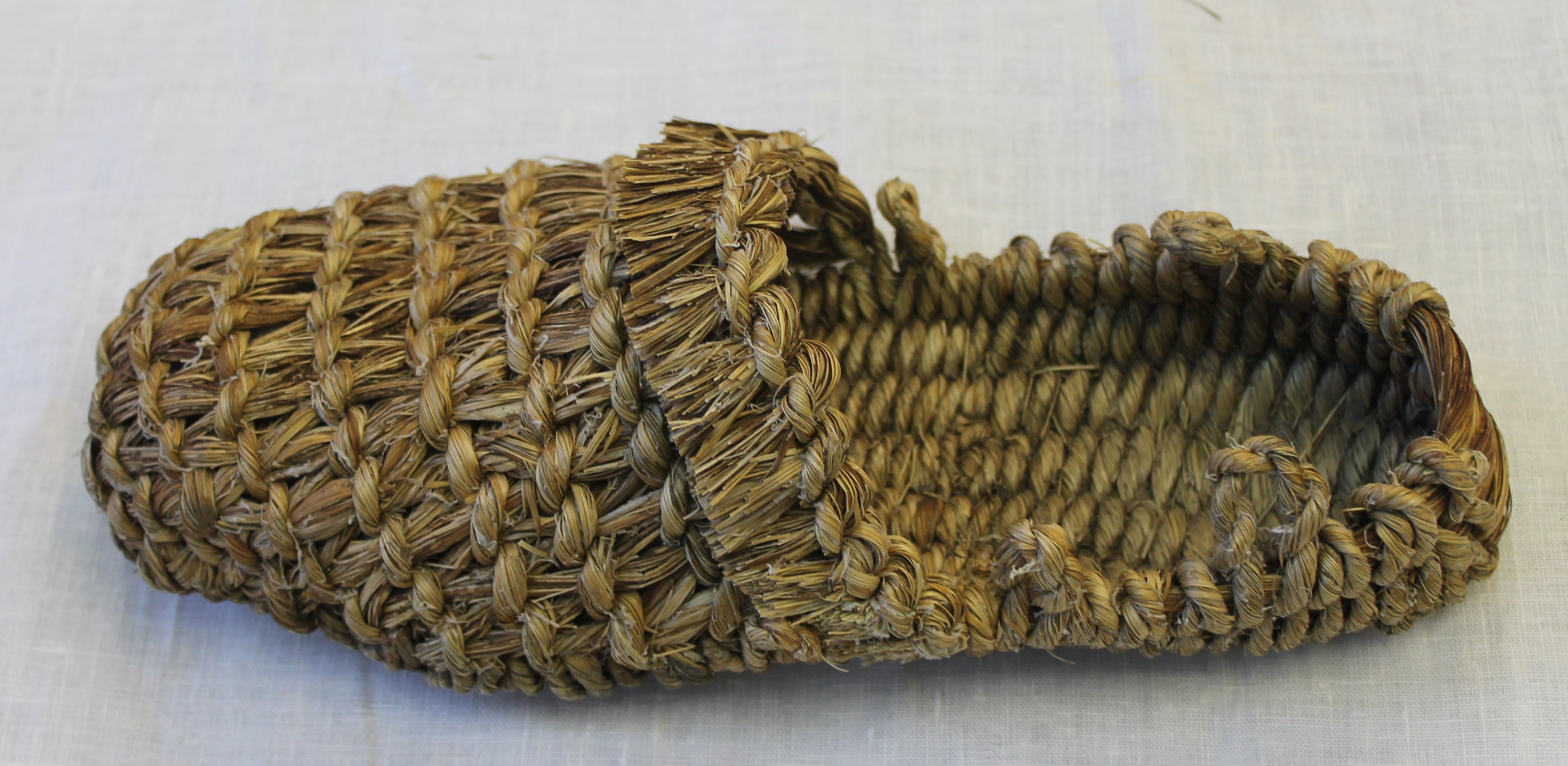
Replica of about 10,000 years old footwear from Oregon

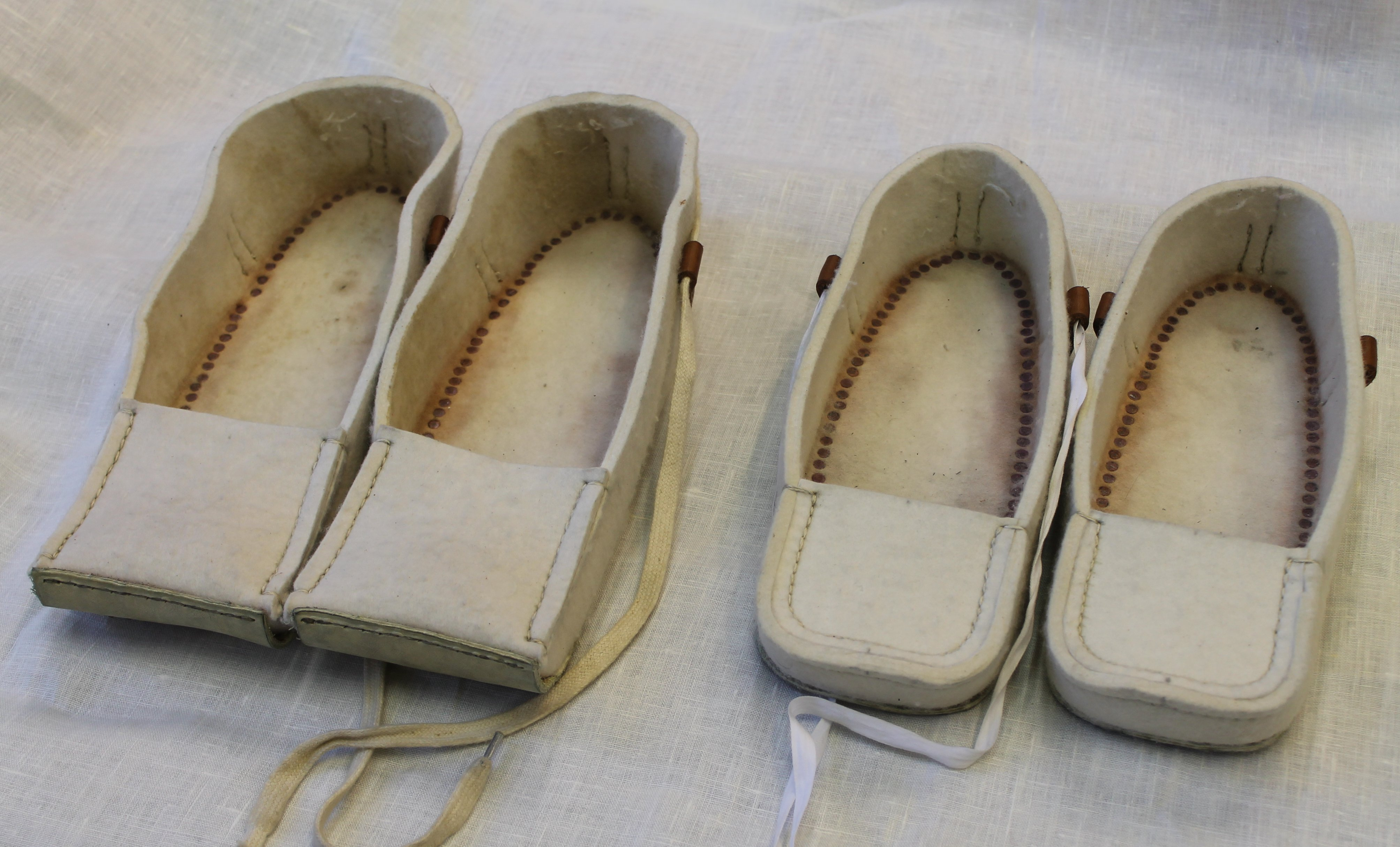
Replica of about 2000 years old footwear of Terracotta Army warriors in China

== Biography ==
He grew up in South Moravia in Boršice, near Buchlov Castle. From 1965 to 1969 he studied at the Secondary Technical School in Zlin leather. Upon graduation he worked at a shoe factory, Svit, as a production foreman. From 1970 to 1979 he studied at the Brno University of Technology. In 1979, he began working as a lecturer there.

He was Dean of the Faculty of Technology at Tomas Bata University in Zlin from 2007 to 2011. On June 15, 2007, he was elected to the position by the Academic Senate of FT and on July 1, 2007 he was appointed by the rector. He was inaugurated on October 10, 2007. In 2011, at the beginning of the next term of office, he resigned for health reasons.

During his time at the Faculty of Technology, he pedagogically led many students and elevated the field of shoes in scientific excellence.

He was Vice President of the Czech Footwear and Leather Association for science and research. He represented the Czech Republic in international organizations such as United Nations Industrial Development Organization (UNIDO) and was an active member of the UNIDO Leather and Leather Products Industry Panel. He participated in the international working group for the diabetic foot. He contributed to the new global nomenclature for shoe sizes published by the International Organization for Standardization (ISO). He was a sworn shoe expert and was chairman of the Chamber of expert witnesses - section leather & shoes.

He long-term studied the history of footwear.

He studied and described paleotic Indian sandals from Fort Rock Cave in Oregon (USA), moccasins from salt mines in Hallstatt (Kunsthistorisches Museum, Vienna, Austria), footwear of the Terracotta Army of the First Sovereign Emperor Qin (Lin - tong in Xi'an, China), Byzantine sandals from Istanbul (Turkey), fragments of shoes from the reliquary of St. Maurus (chateau in Bečov nad Teplou, Czech Republic), boots of Albrecht von Wallenstein (Regional Museum Cheb, Czech Republic), footwear of floater from the well at Špilberk (Brno, Czech Republic). He tried to add the missing chapter in the Handbook of Dionysus Furn about the symbolism of sandals (shoes) on Byzantine icons, and documented the shoes of ancient statues in 24 ancient and archaeological museums in Greece. He collaborated on the story sandal from finding the strength Massada (Israel) and fragments of shoes from the Qumran Caves in the West Bank. With his research team, he participated in the research of Ötzi - The Iceman shoes and performed archaeological experiments.

== Publications ==
- Connolly T, Hlavacek P, Moore K: 10,000 Years of Shoes, University of Oregon, 2011, 99 pages, see at Amazon
- Malina J. and others (incl. Hlaváček P.): The Dictionary of Anthropology (with consideration of the history of literature and art) or What Every Human Should Know about Humans, 2009, Brno, 4738p, see online
- Bus S., Valk D., van Deursen R., Armstrong D., Caravaggi C., Hlaváček P., Bakker K., Cavanagh P.: Specific guidelines on footwear and offloading, Diabetes Metab Res Rev 2008; 24(Suppl 1): S192–S193, see PDF
- Bus SA, Valk GD, van Deursen RW, Armstrong DG, Caravaggi C., Hlaváček P., Bakker K., Cavanagh PR:The effectiveness of footwear and offloading interventions to prevent and heal foot ulcers and reduce plantar pressure in diabetes: a systematic review, 2008, see

== Said about him ==
Former UNIDO colleague Ivan Král said of Petr Hlavacek: “His positive, constructive approach, and his commitment, integrity and competence, set standards hard to maintain. He leaves behind an amazing legacy, and for that he will be always fondly remembered.” see China Leather Web
