= Novara (disambiguation) =

Novara is an Italian city in the province of Novara, Piedmont.

Novara may also refer to:

== Other places in Italy ==
- Casaleggio Novara, a commune outside Novara
- Novara di Sicilia, a commune on Sicily
- Province of Novara, Piedmont
- Roman Catholic Diocese of Novara, Piedmont
- Cascina Novara, a locality in Ghedi commune, province of Brescia, Lombardy

== Military ==
- 157th Infantry Division "Novara", an Italian formation in World War II
- SMS Novara, one of two Austro-Hungarian Navy ships
- Battle of Novara (1513), War of the League of Cambrai
- Battle of Novara (1849), First Italian War of Independence

== Other uses ==
- Novara (bicycles), an American brand
- Novara FC, association football club of the city
- Novara Media, a British media organisation

== See also ==
- Navara (disambiguation)
