= Jan Kubíček =

- Born: 30 December 1927; Kolín, Czechoslovakia
- Died: 14 October 2013 (aged 85); Kolín, Czech Republic
- Education: School of Applied Arts in Prague, Academy of Performing Arts in Prague
- Known for: Painting, printmaking, photography
- Movement: Constructivism, Lettrism, Concrete art
- Awards: Vladimír Boudník Award
- Website: art-jankubicek.cz

Jan Kubíček (30 December 1927 – 14 October 2013) was a Czech painter and printmaker, and one of the most radical Central European exponents of constructivist and concrete art. He also spent more than a decade illustrating children's books for Czechoslovakia's main publishing house Albatros and designed iconic film posters and book covers throughout the 1960s. Moreover, having passed through a significant Lettrism phase during the early 1960s, he left behind an impressive body of photographs, illustrations and graphic art for which he received the 1999 Vladimír Boudník Award.

== Education ==
From 1949 to 1953, under the tutelage of Prof. Jan Novak, Kubíček studied at the School of Applied Arts in Prague, from where he graduated. From 1954 to 1957, under the tutelage of Prof. František Tröster, Kubíček studied scenography at the Academy of Performing Arts in Prague.

Jan Kubíček was a member of the Czech designers' group Hollar, contributed to exhibitions of Czech constructivism from the late 1960s, and concomitantly was involved with Klub Konkretistov.

== Role in Czech post-war art ==
Ladislav Daněk of the Olomouc Museum of Art relates, "Jan Kubíček substantially influenced Czech post-war art several times. At the turn of the 1960s his paintings were a certain antipole to the "dark" tones of structural abstraction. Subsequently, from 1962 to 1966, he participated in the formation of the Czech form of the international lettrism movement. From 1967 Kubíček was one of the key figures of neo-constructivist tendencies, and he continued to develop his original geometric programme until the end of his life. Kubíček's photographic work, though seldom mentioned, is also significant. The characteristic features of the artist's works of lettrism and geometric abstraction are: the sense of order, the striking visual message, the absence of literary contents and a precise painting technique." (Note: "We find all of these features in the painting Composition with an Arrow, Letters and a Number," Daněk continues regarding the acquisition, "which is one of his lettrist works that was significant in his development.")

Kubíček was a step ahead even in the artistic circles of his day. Owing to prohibitive strictures of the totalitarian regime, his work only gradually became widely appreciated in recent decades. Writes Jiří Machalický, "Not everyone will understand Kubíček’s way of thinking in the same way. It is not a mathematical game, but an exact solution to problems, combined with intuition, without which art is impossible. And if we look at his work as a whole, it possesses an immeasurable logic found with few other artists, as well as the ability to open up other alternatives. It was a natural part not only of Czech, but also of progressive European art, which continued to develop the legacy of pure abstraction and constructivist tendencies."

From an early fascination with visual aspects of the contemporary city, Kubíček developed an autonomous use of geometry in his work. Kubíček was one of the few Czech artists engaged in conceptual geometry. Since the 1960s his art is immersed in constructivist principles and tendencies. His masterpieces include, apart from paintings and prints, constructivist objects made of plastic and/or metal. Kubílček, alongside Sýkora, Karel Malich and Hugo Demartini, ranks among the most significant exponents of Czech constructivism.

During the Soviet occupation of 1968, Kubíček took the advantage of the chaos at the border and transported his artworks without permission to a solo exhibition at Gallery Teufel in Koblenz. "Owing to Prague Spring," writes Julie Koch, "Kubíček was able to deepen his contacts with Western artists. His work has proven to be remarkably parallel to trends on the international scene. Like other principle figures of constructivist/concrete art, Kubíček is popular in Switzerland, Holland and particularly Germany." (Note: Jan Kubíček's international constructivist peers include the Swiss artists Richard Paul Lohse and Max Bill, the German artists Hartmut Böhm, Heijo Hangen, and Klaus Staudt, and the Hungarian artist Dóra Maurer.)

I am standing before the statement of something as self-evident as the relationships created by the elementary division of a square. I give visual form to basic rules, even though painting that is executed differently than in the past possesses almost nothing that is 'painterly' anymore. Reduced content has necessitated a thoroughly reduced form and a reduction of all the finesse used in the art of painting. To summarize, state, put forth, and present the beautiful existing knowledge of the discovered order is a concrete reason for this painting project and concomitantly the purpose of choice.

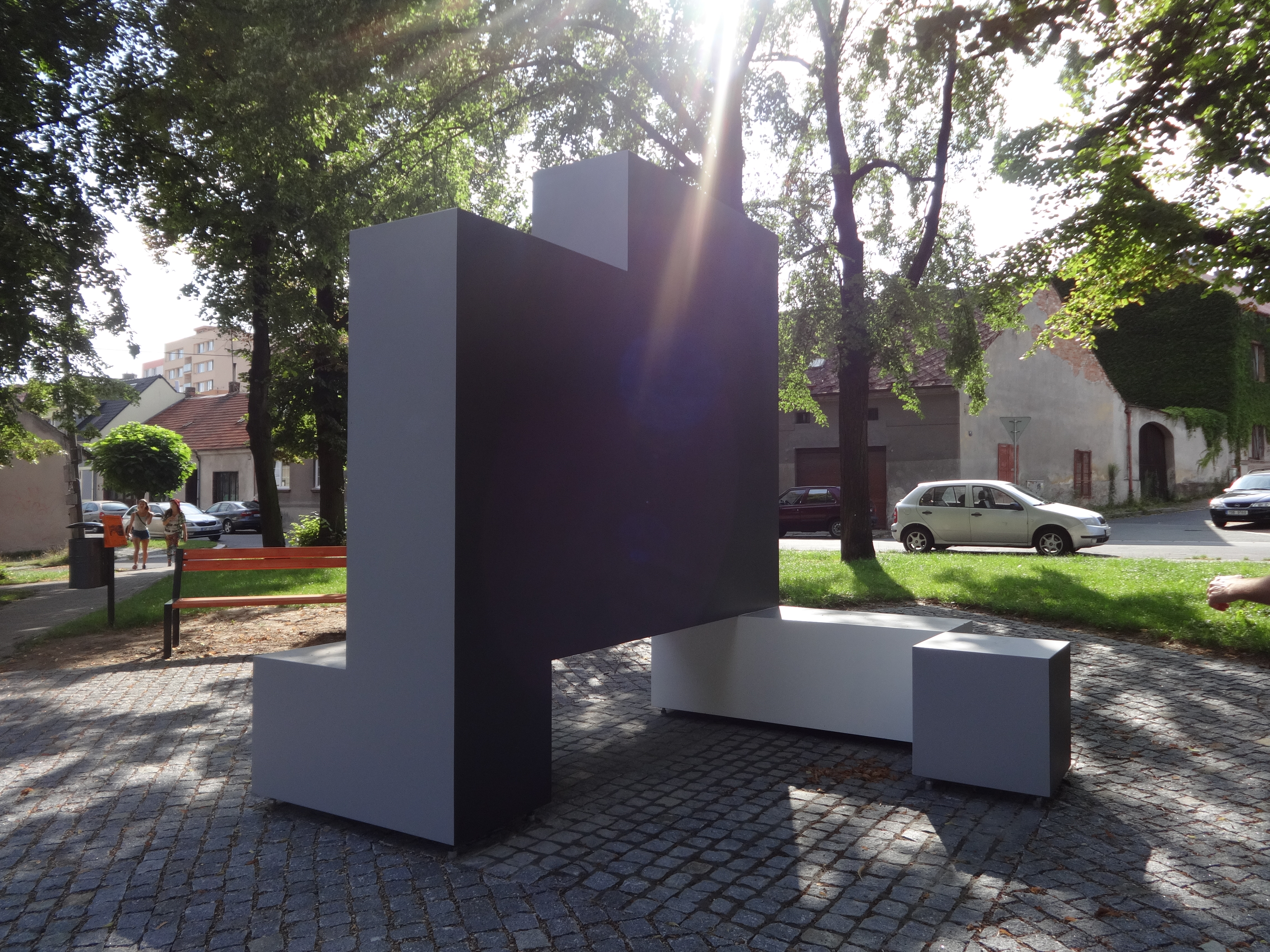
In 2016, Czech architect Zdeněk Fránek fabricated an enormous steel version of a tiny Kubíček object, and the resultant work was installed as a memorial to Kubíček in his birthplace city of Kolín.

== Objects ==
Early in his career Kubíček realised that the third dimension would render his work more complex and complete. Perspex seemed to him the ideal material for this purpose. Moreover, the layering of sheets in space allowed the viewer to see through objects, and multiple layers accentuated colors, proffering tones distinct from those available through the conventional mixing of acrylic paints. "The essence of my geometric work is simplicity and comprehensiveness," said Kubíček. “When I transform my sketches into artefacts made of wood, plastic and other materials, some elements of the construction will always remain hidden from the viewer's eye. Perspex, on the other hand, makes the construction transparent and legible, revealing details otherwise obfuscated by opaque materials."

Apart from a bevy of smaller metal artifacts, Kubíček designed a collection of rods and prisms, which were exhibited in the Gallery of Václav Špála in 1969 as a radically minimalist installation. Artistic objects form a unique part of Kubíček’s work—they are limited in number and distinct from his other work. Many objects originate from the mid to late 1960s and have never been exhibited nor publicly examined.

Kubíček was aware of the possibilities offered by plastic design. Unfortunately, he was not prepared to make large plastic artifacts. Instead he designed them as experiments or samples. "Most ended up in German collections, some pieces are in the ownership of collectors and museums in our country, and three objects fell victim to one wild party in my old studio," the artist confessed in an interview.

Kubíček ultimately returned to his primary medium, painting, which he continued to develop and improve. His objects thus constitute a closed collection. Kubíček said, "Most objects remain sketches on paper, but they deserve placement in architecture. One could then retrospectively show at least some of my works from years past. They would disclose their spatial form and convey vital geometric and constructivist thoughts and values." In 2016 one of Kubíček's designs for a large object was realized by architect Zdeněk Fránek and installed as a Jan Kubíček memorial at a public park in his birthplace city of Kolín, Husově náměstí, opposite the city's Jan Hus memorial.

== Retrospective ==
In April 2014, six months after his death, Prague Municipal Gallery held a major retrospective of Kubíček's work, consisting of about 150 pieces from Czech and European collections, curated by Hans-Peter Riese, (Note: Hans-Peter Riese is well-known in the Czech Republic. During the 1960s he was a German radio correspondent in Prague while concomitantly an art historian and collector, meeting with Kubíček and other Czech concrete artists and helping them to succeed in Germany.) and signaling a new era for the acknowledgement and appreciation of Kubíček's oeuvre. "Kubíček's work is artistically and spiritually multifaceted, branching off into an incredible variety of directions," wrote Czech art critic Jan Šída.

The following year a consolidated version of Riese's Kubíček retrospective traveled to the Anger Museum in Erfurt, Germany.
