= Brno University of Technology =

University in the Czech Republic

- Vysoké učení technické v Brně
- Motto: Sapere aude (Latin)
- Motto in English: Have the courage to be wise
- Type: Public
- Established: September 19, 1899; 126 years ago
- Founder: Franz Joseph I
- Affiliations: EUA; CESAER
- Rector: Ladislav Janíček
- Students: 17,500
- Location: Brno, Czech Republic; 49°12′5.55″N 16°36′13.01″E
- Campus: Urban
- Website: https://www.vut.cz/en/

University rankings

Global – Overall
- QS World: =575 (2026)

Brno University of Technology (BUT; Czech: Vysoké učení technické v Brně, VUT) is a public technical university in Brno, Czech Republic. Founded on 19 September 1899 as the first Czech university in Moravia, the university comprises 8 faculties and three university institutes and has more than 18,000 students. Its teaching and research are centred on engineering and technology, particularly civil engineering, mechanical engineering, electrical engineering, computer science and information technology, alongside architecture, natural sciences, economics and management, fine arts and design.

== History ==
The Jesuits dominated university education in Moravia at the beginning of the 18th century as they controlled the University of Olomouc. The focus on theology and philosophy was not welcomed by the Moravian nobility. The nobility initiated the commencement of law education at the University of Olomouc in 1679. Later in 1725, the Moravian nobility enforced the establishment of the Academy of Nobility in Olomouc. Law and economy, mathematics, geometry, civil and military architecture, history, and geography were lectured there. Foreign languages, dance, swordsmanship, and equitation were also taught there as it aimed to promote knighthood. The Academy was in Olomouc until 1847 when it was relocated to Brno, where it became the basis for what was later to become the University of Technology.

Due to the extinction of the University in Olomouc, no institution would provide an academic education in Moravia. Only one technical school, besides the German one, could not cover the lack of need, so the students mostly left to Prague, Vienna, or Kraków. Related to this situation, the voices that called for the establishment of a university – not a regional one in Olomouc but in the provincial capital, Brno – grew stronger. The Moravian Germans rejected the second Czech university which led to many quarrels (the settlement occurred after the collapse of the Austro-Hungarian Empire in 1919 by the establishment of Masaryk University). In September 1899 the disputes were partially solved by founding the Ceská technická vysoká škola Františka Josefa v Brně, roughly translated into English as Imperial Czech Technical School of Franz Joseph in Brno.

In the beginning, the university was settled in Augustine Street and had to make do with 4 professors and 47 students who could study only Civil Engineering. In the following year (1900) the teaching of the field of machine engineering was started and followed by cultural engineering (landscaping), electrical engineering, and chemical engineering. After World War I, it was also possible to study architecture. In 1911 the university was moved into a newly built luxurious building in Veveří Street which is still used by the Faculty of Civil Engineering. In the interwar period, it was connected with Deutsche Technische Hochschule Brünn and was renamed the Brno University of Technology. The school has used the name of the University of Technology of Dr. E. Beneš for a short time.

After the German occupation of Czechoslovakia and installing the Protectorate of Bohemia and Moravia, all Czech universities, including the Czech Technical University, were forced to close (see International Students' Day). After the end of the war in 1945, the university was restored to its pre-war state, also taking over buildings of Deutsche Technische Hochschule Brünn (the German technical school) which was closed. After the war, the school was reopened under the older name the University of Technology of Dr. E. Beneš. The school was ceased to exist in 1951; some parts were transferred to the newly established Military Technical Academy. The only faculties that provided civilian training remained the Faculty of Civil Engineering and Architecture Faculty, both under the name College of Engineering. Already in 1956, the university activity was gradually restored under the present name Brno University of Technology. Today's appearance was more or less stabilized in 1961.

After 1989 there was a reorganization of certain faculties and the emergence of many new ones. The Faculty of Chemistry (1992) was restored; in addition to the technical fields, BUT focused on the economy (Faculty of Business founded in 1992) and arts (Faculty of Fine Arts, founded in 1993).

Another milestone is occurred in 2000 when the BUT separated two faculties deployed in Zlín – Faculty of Technology and Faculty of Management and Economics – and thus established the Tomas Bata University.

The most recent significant organizational change is the splitting of the Faculty of Electrical Engineering and Faculty of Electrical Engineerin and Computer Science at the Faculty of Electrical Engineering and Communication and the Faculty of Information Technology which occurred in 2002.

Most of the BUT buildings are now located in the area under Palacký Hill in the city district Královo Pole. There are the Faculty of Mechanical Engineering, Faculty of Business, Faculty of Chemistry, and a new building of the Faculty of Electrical Engineering and Communication as well as two college campuses.

Faculty of Information Technology is located in a former Carthusian monastery in Božetěchova Street and the new complex across the street. The Faculty of Civil Engineering is located in an extensively reconstructed building on Veveří Street. Faculty of Architecture is located on Poříčí Street, Faculty of Fine Arts on Údolní Street. BUT also uses the third college campus in Kounicova Street. Rector's Offices are located in a newly renovated Baroque building in Antonínská Street.

== Authorities ==
The head of the university is the rector who is represented by five prorectors in various fields of activity. Financial matters of BUT are in the hands of the bursar, communication and promotion is the business of the public relations officer in cooperation with the Unit of external relations. Important documents and guidelines are discussed and approved by the Academic Senate which consisted of an employee and a student chamber. The scientific direction of BUT determines the Scientific Council, acting as BUT experts, other universities, and industry.

Each of the faculty is governed by the dean and his vice-deans. Also, the faculties have their academic senates which deal exclusively with the laws of the faculties. Similarly, the faculties have their scientific council. There are several student organizations in BUT, for historical reasons called the Student Unions. Each Faculty has its student chamber which represents students in the Academic Senate - students have the opportunity to participate in the management of their faculty.

- Rectorate — prof. RNDr. Ing. Petr Štěpánek, CSc., dr. h. c.
- The Academic Senate — current chairman of the senate is doc. Dr. Ing. Petr Hanáček.
- Bursar — doc. Ing. Ladislav Janíček, Ph.D., MBA, LL.M. is the university bursar.

== Faculties ==
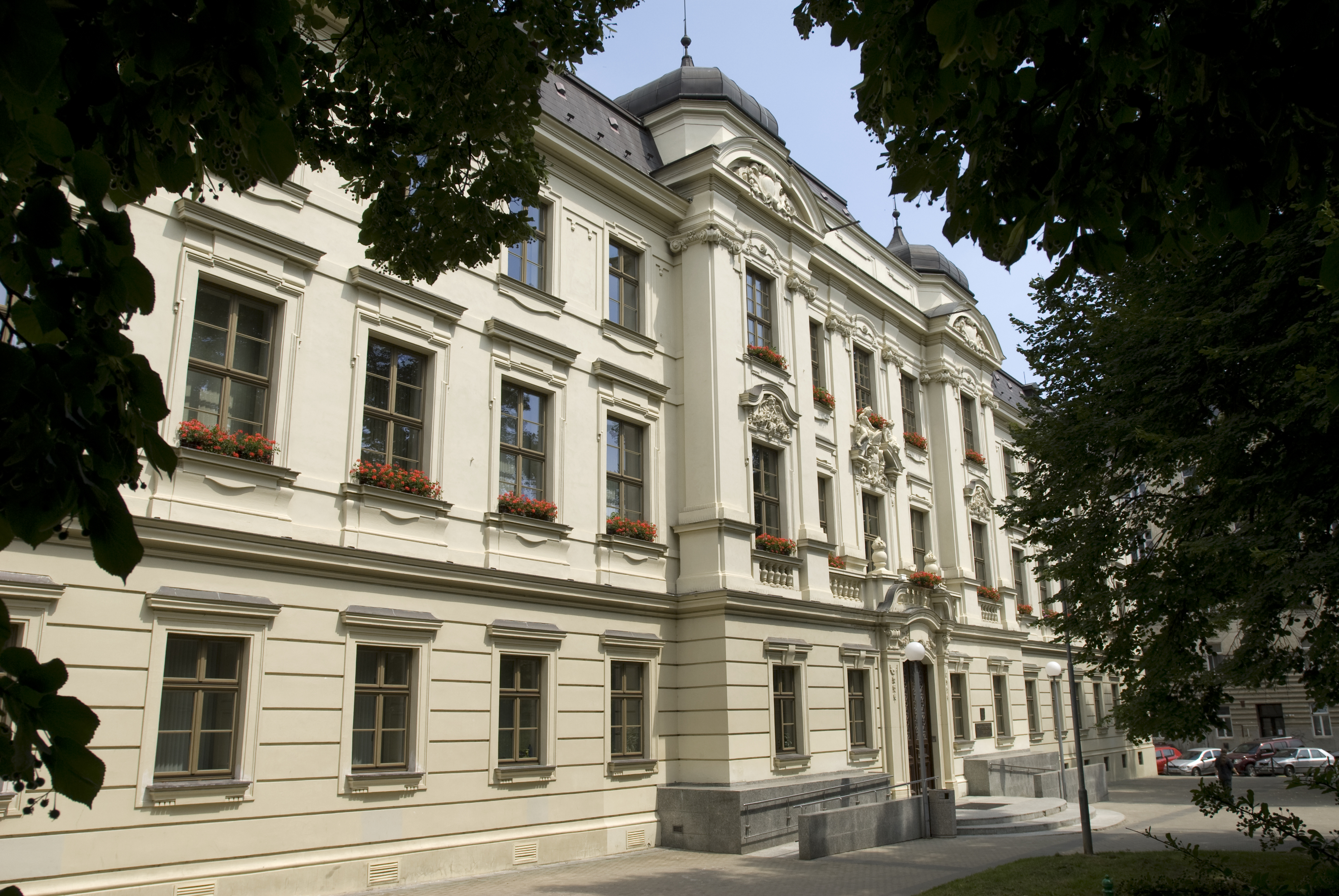
Rector's office in Antonínská Street

- Faculty of Civil Engineering
- Faculty of Mechanical Engineering
- Faculty of Chemistry
- Faculty of Architecture
- Faculty of Business and Management
- Faculty of Electrical Engineering and Communication
- Faculty of Fine Arts
- Faculty of Information Technology

=== Faculty of Architecture (FA) ===
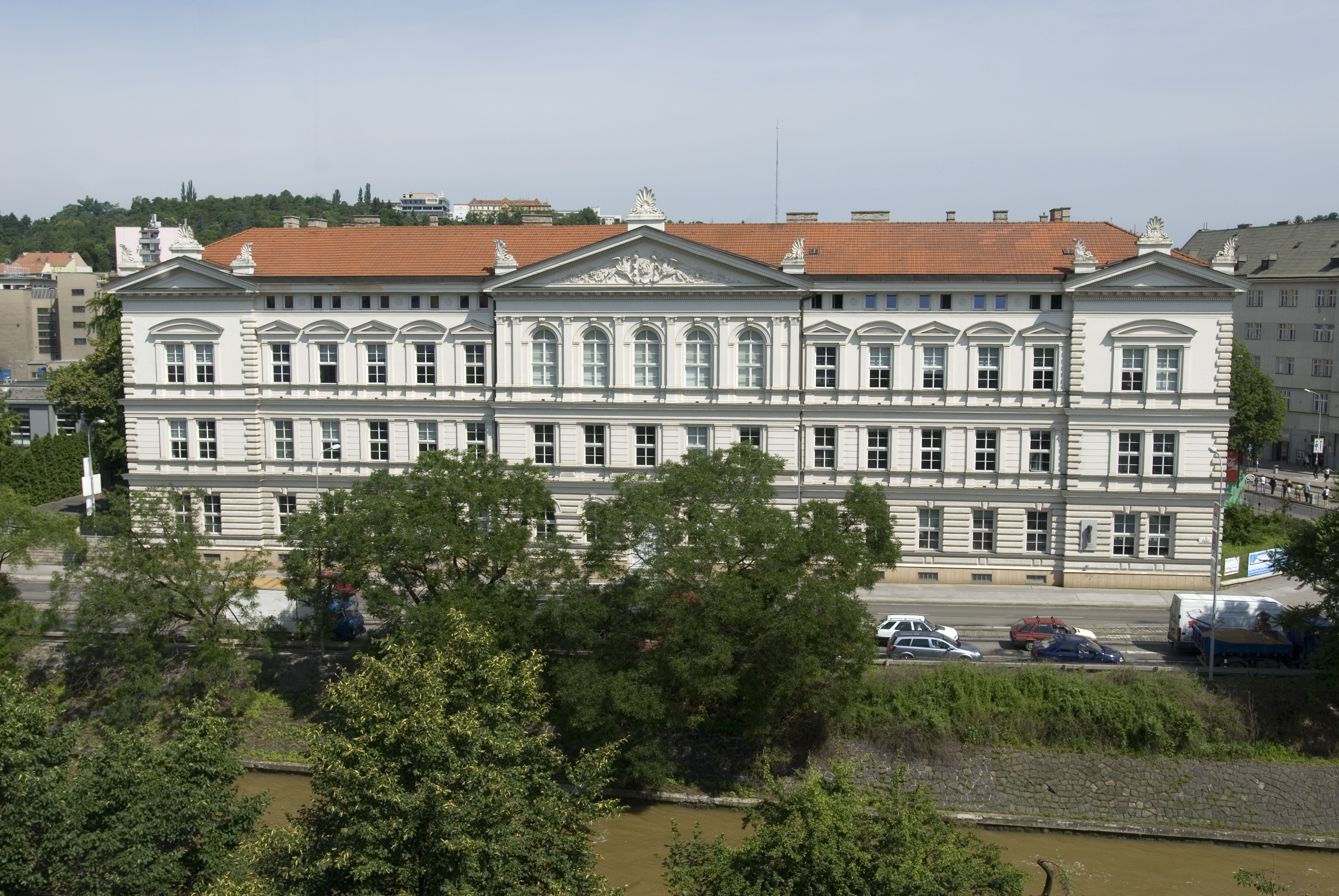
Faculty of Architecture

One of the oldest faculties of Brno University of Technology was established in 1919. During its existence the faculty was merged with the Faculty of civil Engineering. Currently provides training in architecture and urban design and has about three hundred students.

=== Faculty of Chemistry (FC) ===
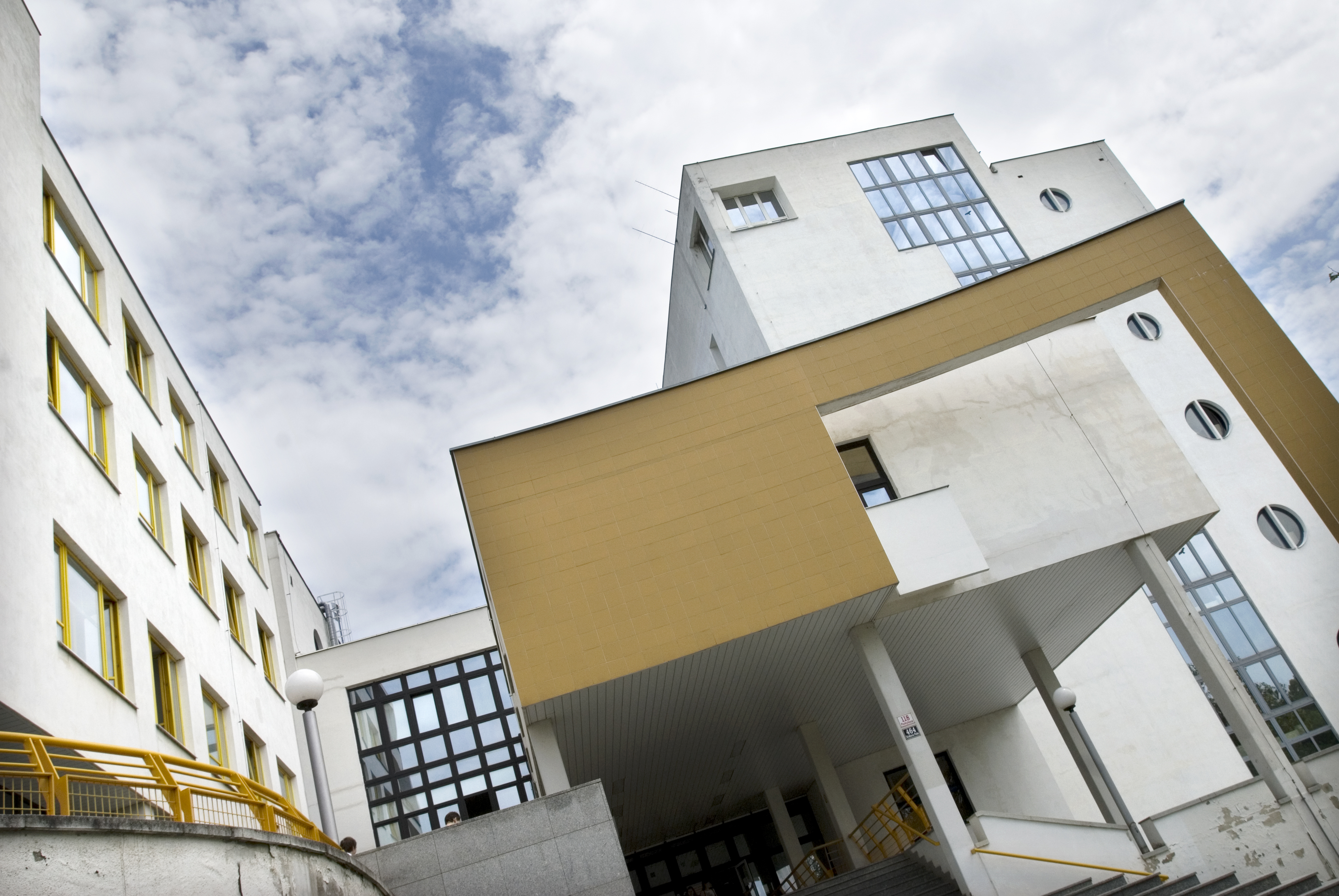
Faculty of Chemistry

Teaching Chemistry at BUT dates back to 1911 when there was established Department of Chemistry at the Czech Technical University. The development was interrupted in 1951 by converting BUT to the Military Technical Academy. The restoration of the teaching of chemistry was reached in 1992. Faculty realizes bachelor's, master's and doctoral degree programs in chemistry and food industry.

=== Faculty of Electrical Engineering and Communication (FEEC) ===
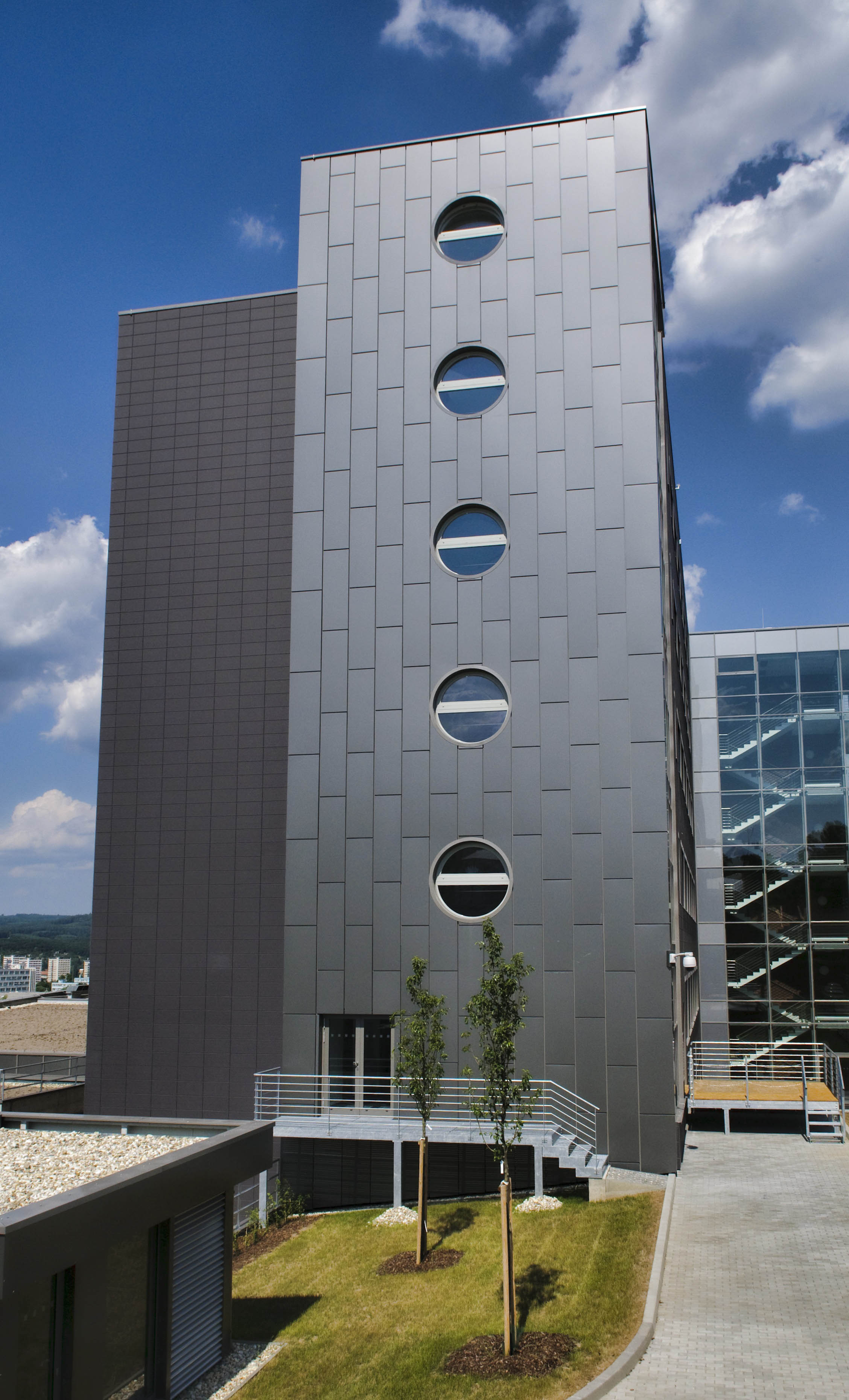
Building of the Faculty of Electrical Engineering and Communication

Studying at the faculty is focused on a wide range of scientific areas: control technology and robotics, biomedical engineering, power electronics and electrical engineering, electrotechnology and electronics, microelectronics, radioelectronics and teleinformatics.

=== Faculty of Information Technology (FIT) ===
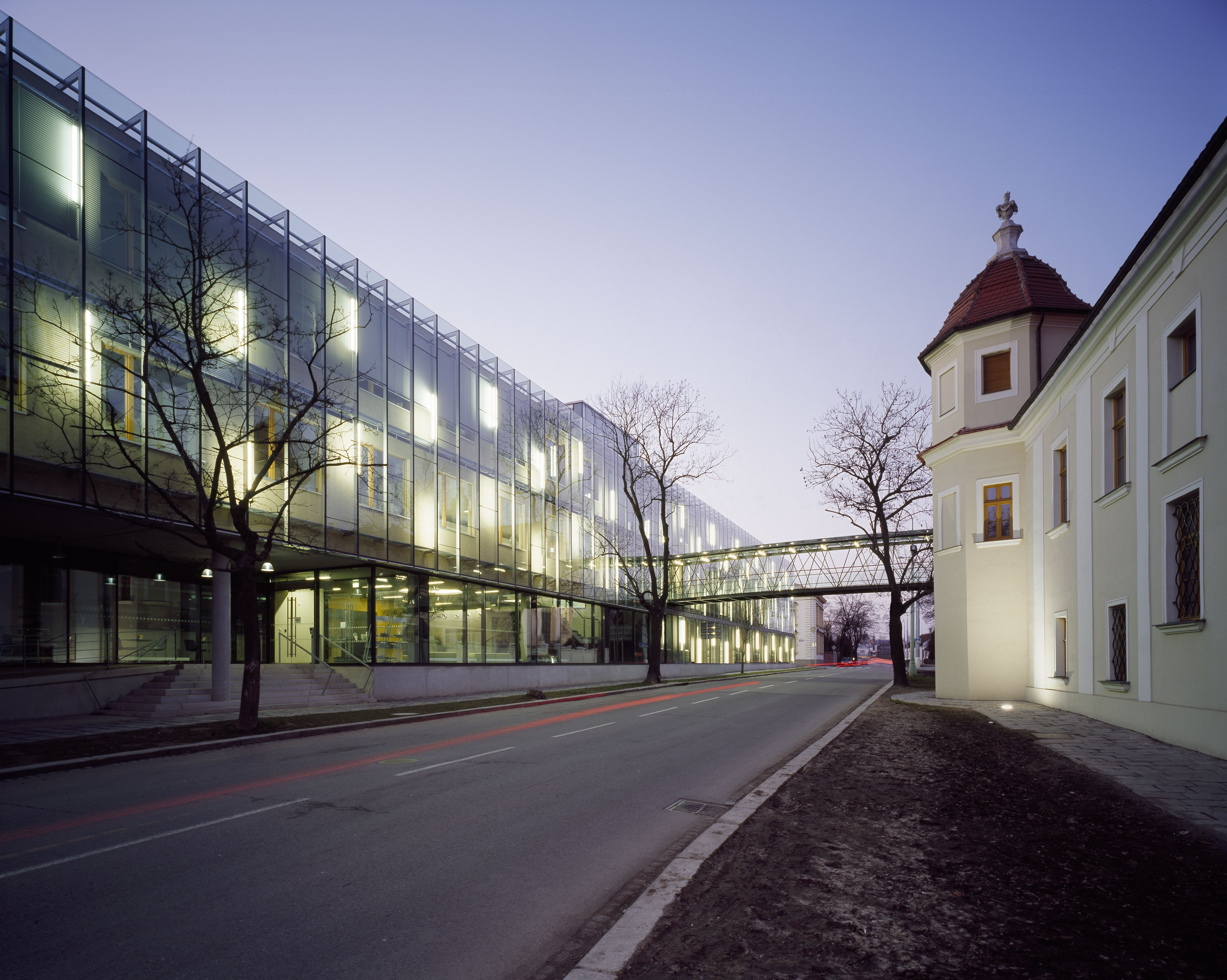
Faculty of Information Technology

Already in 1964 the department of automatic computers was established in the Faculty of Electrical Engineering, lately the institute of informatics detached which was transformed in 2002 into an independent faculty of information technology. FIT campus is located in a former Carthusian monastery and the former estate.

The faculty consists of four institutes:

- Department of Computer Systems
- Department of Information Systems
- Department of Intelligent Systems
- Department of Computer Graphics and Multimedia

The faculty offers two basic levels of study - a three-year bachelor and two-year master's degree program. The third level is the doctoral degree program.

=== Faculty of Business and Management (FBM) ===
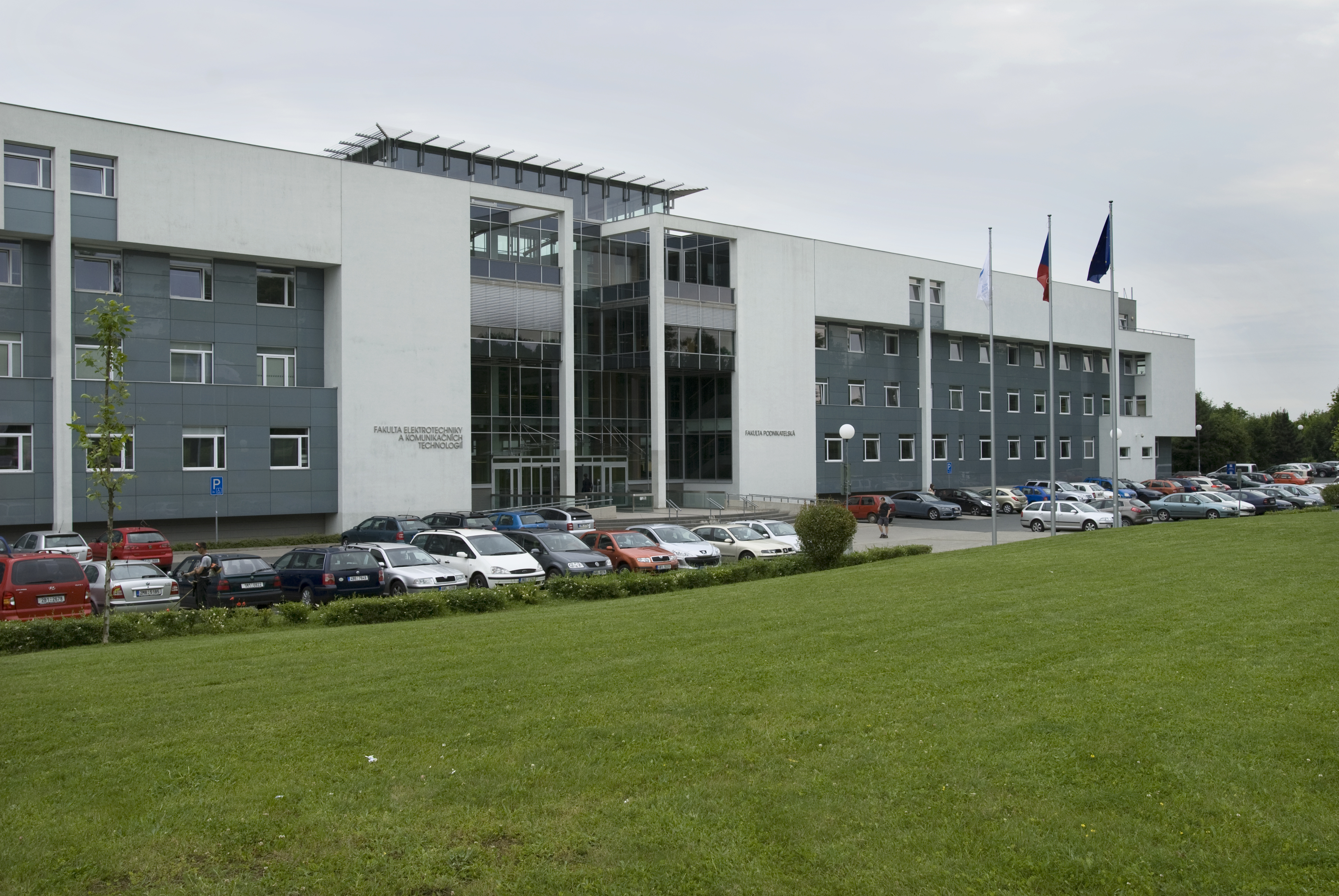
Faculty of Business and Management

One of the youngest BUT faculty focuses on the economy and business fields of study. In 1992 the faculty was separated from the original Faculty of Mechanical Engineering. Besides bachelor's, master's and doctoral programs in this field the faculty offers in cooperation with foreign universities postgraduate MBA studies. About 3 000 students study management, accounting, corporate finance, taxation and managerial science.

=== Faculty of Civil Engineering (FCE) ===
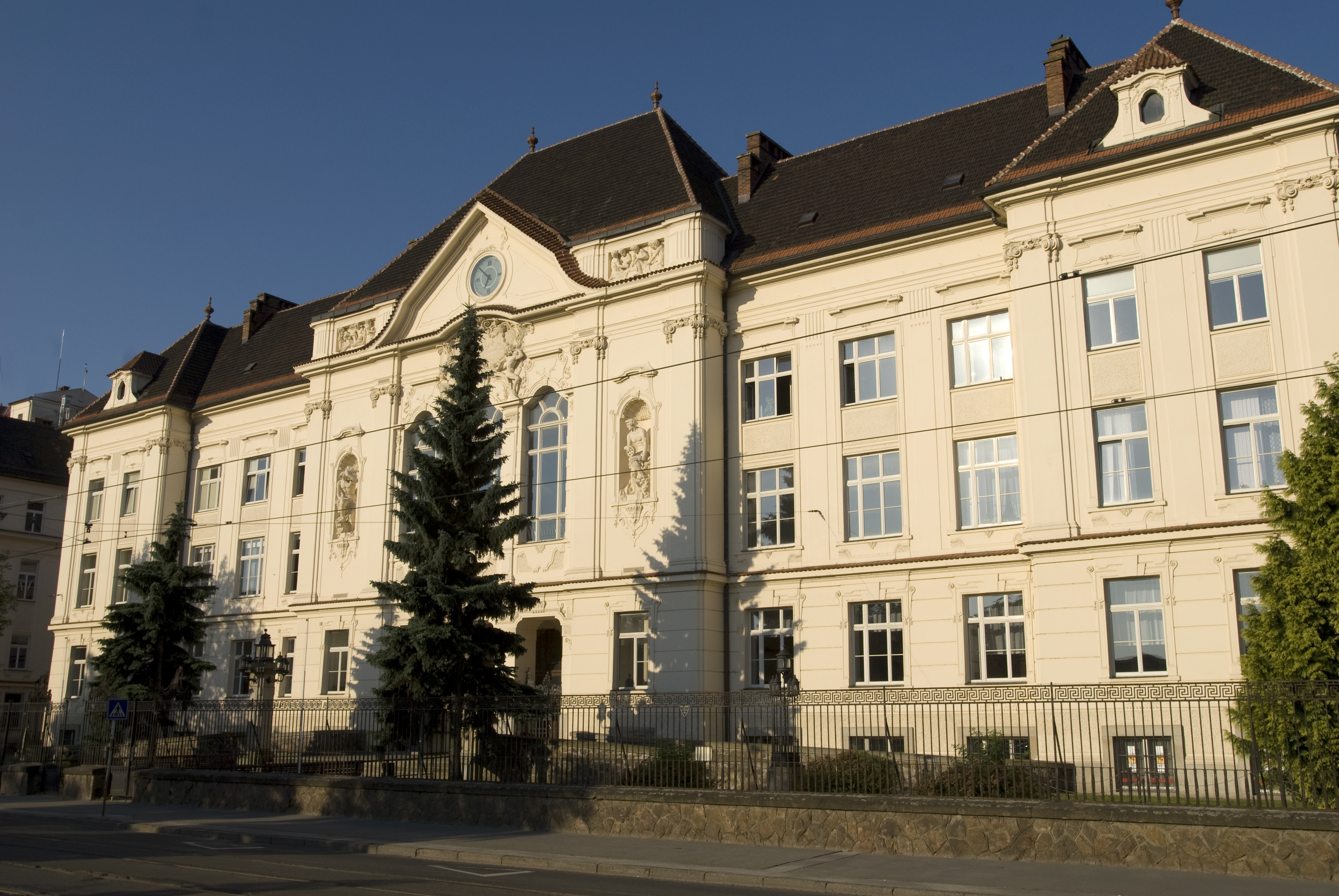
Faculty of Civil Engineering in Veveří Street

FCE is the oldest faculty of Brno University of Technology and the biggest one with its number of students – 6 500. In 1899 the university started its activities with this branch and that faculty was the only one which survived a violent change - transformation BUT into the Military Technical Academy in 1951.

Students can study in four programmes in Czech at this faculty:

- Civil Engineering
- Urban Engineering
- Surveying and Cartography
- Architecture

and one programme in English:

- Civil Engineering

=== Faculty of Mechanical Engineering (FME) ===
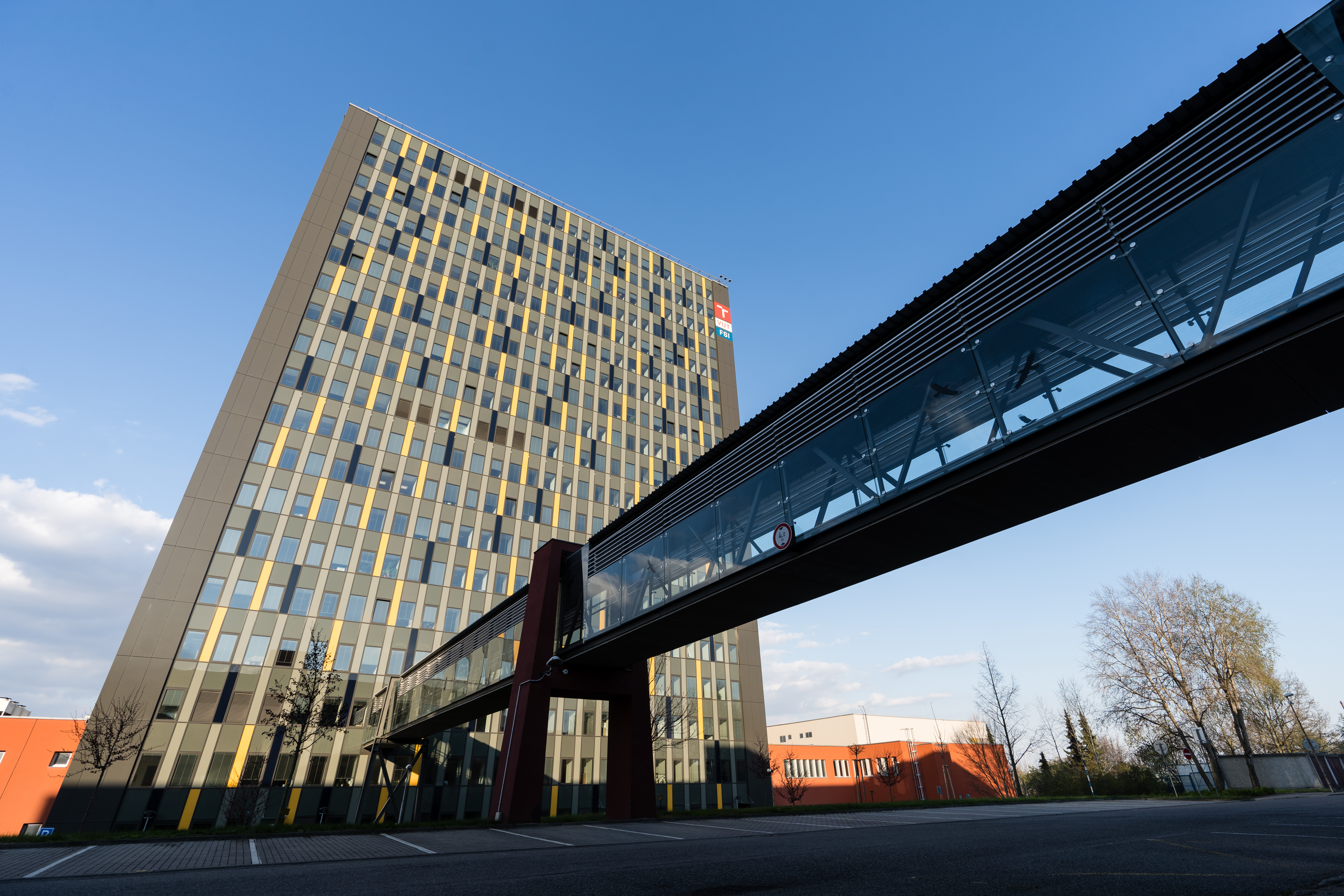
Faculty of Mechanical Engineering

The opening of the engineering department was in 1900 and herewith it is the second oldest faculty of the BUT. In the past there was taught energy branch from which subsequently became an independent Faculty of Electrical Engineering.

The faculty offers study of:

- Engineering
- Applied Sciences in Engineering
- Mechanical Engineering
- Production Systems
- Industrial Design
- Industrial Engineering
- Machines and Equipment
- Applied Natural Sciences
- Physical and Materials Engineering
- Metrology and Quality Assurance Testing

=== Faculty of Fine Arts (FFA) ===
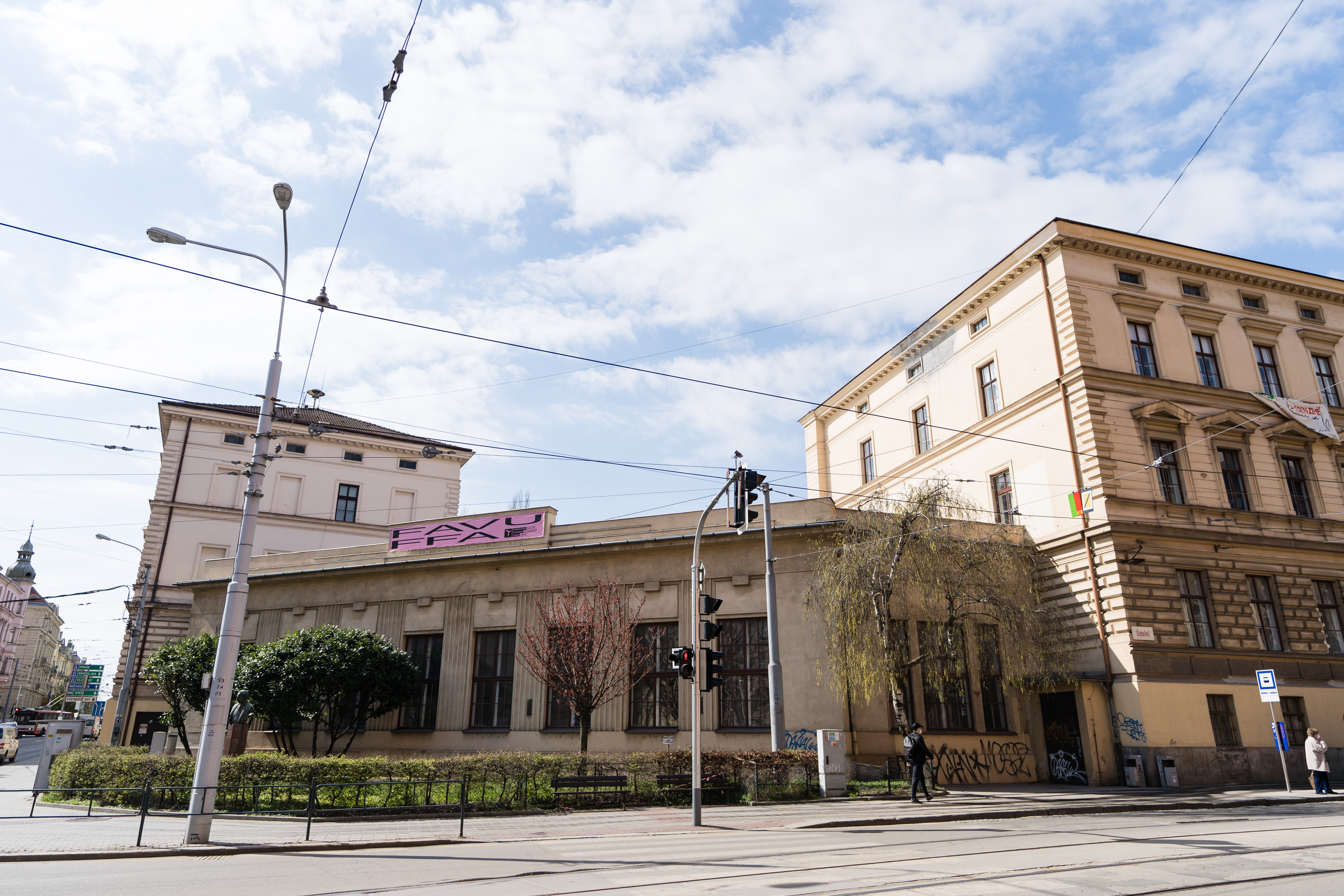
Faculty of Fine Arts

On the contrary, one of the youngest BUT faculties is the Faculty of Fine Arts. In 1993 it was founded from the institute of fine arts which was based in the faculty of architecture a year earlier. As the number of students (3 thousands) it is the smallest faculty of current BUT. Some of the study programs are:

- painting
- sculpture
- graphics
- graphic design
- industrial design
- conceptual tendencies
- VMP (multimedia, video-performance).

== University institutes ==
=== Institute of Forensic Engineering (IFE) ===
The aim of the institute is teaching forensic experts in master's degree programs - Venture engineering and Forensic engineering (expert engineering in transportation and real estate). It is possible to study The Forensic engineering program as a doctoral study. In preparation is the transformation of the institute to the separate department faculty with the temporary name the Faculty of Forensic Engineering.

=== Centre for Sports Activities (CESA) ===
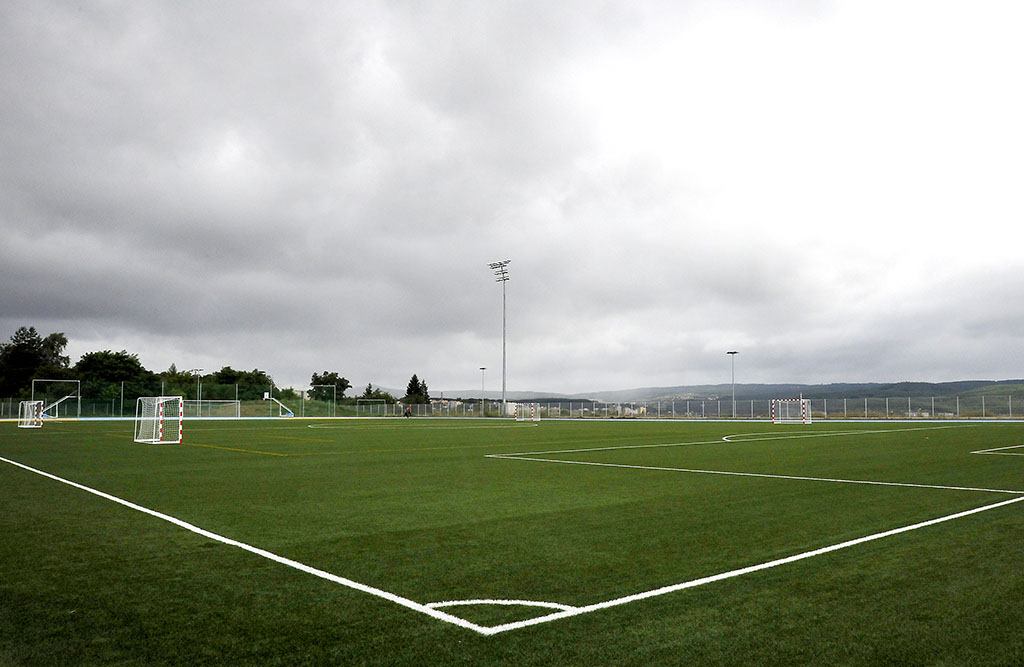
Sports in BUT

In cooperation with the Faculty of Business CESA provides courses of study in Management of Physical Culture. Students can choose from more than 70 sports like basketball, swimming, athletics, golf or diving.

=== CEITEC Brno University of Technology (CEITEC BUT) ===
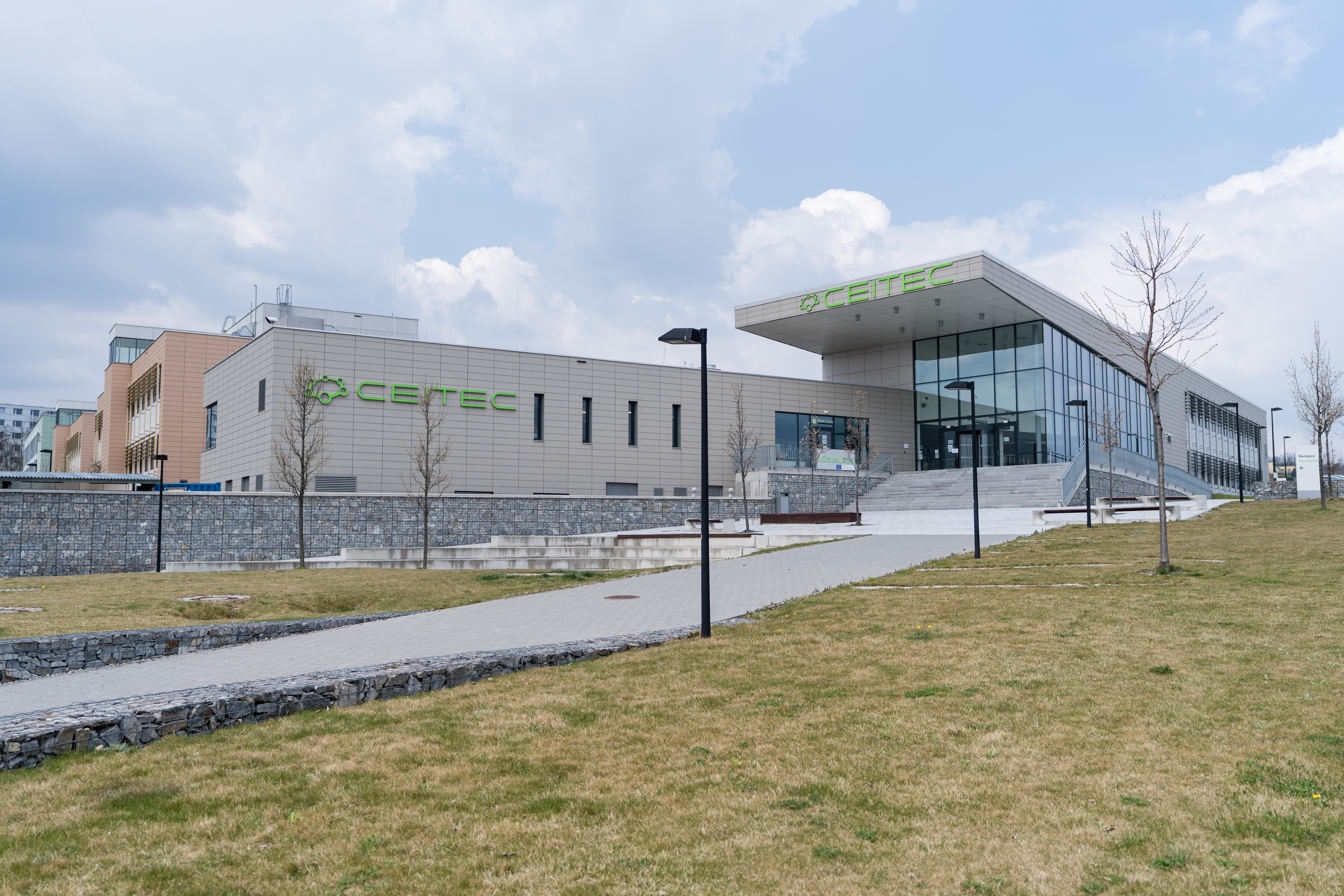
CEITEC BUT

CEITEC is a centre for progressive innovative education which encourages scientific creativity in its research groups and a fostering of the principles of engagement. The institute offers a unique inter-institutional graduate programme, which in general is based on the CEITEC research programmes. Currently, one doctoral programme is available – Advanced Materials and Nanosciences.

In 2018, CEITEC BUT launched two ERC grants, one aimed at enhancing cancer treatment efficiency, led by Vojtěch Adam, and another focusing on new spectroscopy and microscopy technologies, spearheaded by Petr Neugebauer. A third ERC grant commenced in 2021 under Eric D. Glowacki, exploring innovative wireless nerve stimulation in humans. Additionally, CEITEC BUT inaugurated the Industry 4.0 Testbed in winter 2022, a major component of the international European project RICAIP.

== Studies ==
The school is a holder of the European Commission ECTS certificates (European Credit Transfer System) - Label and DS (Diploma Supplement) Label for the period 2009-2013, reflecting the appreciation of quality of the university education in keeping with the principles of the Bologna Declaration. ECTS Label supports studying abroad at universities around the world. DS Label Certificate was awarded for the correct free award of the Diploma Supplement to all graduates of the principles of the European Commission.

Brno University of Technology offers its students:

- 295 study programs (of which 89 are accredited in foreign languages)
- Participation in major international and scientific projects
- Study at foreign and partner universities
- More than 70 sports in 5 own specialized sports centers
- Accommodation in halls of residences for the majority of applicants
- 9 libraries

Study programs:

- Civil, Mechanical, Electrical and Forensic engineering
- Information Technology
- Chemistry
- Economics and Management
- Fine arts
- Architecture

Cooperation with foreign institutions:

- Framework agreements with 90 universities around the world
- International educational research and development programs

Participation in EU programs for education:

- CEEPUS
- LLP / Erasmus
- TEMPUS
- Joint and double degree programs

Lifelong learning:

- Is provided by faculties in their courses
- MBA education (Master of Business Administration)

Lifelong Learning Institute:

- provides counseling, information and organizational services
- offers training and consultancy
- organizes courses and seminars for seniors at the University of the Third Age

== Science and research ==
Research activities at the Brno University of Technology are realized in cooperation with national and international projects, programs, grants and research centers. BUT intensively cooperates with other universities and institutions, with the Academy of Sciences of the Czech Republic and private companies. The efforts of integration of teaching and scientific research are supported by application sector with which new curricula is prepared. Students can obtain a range of practical experience during their studies, thereby facilitating the selection of employment and competitiveness of BUT graduates. One of the BUT goals is to become a research university.

=== Main research areas ===
- Environmental Technology
- IT and communication technology
- Aeronautical Engineering
- Materials Engineering
- Microelectronics and Nanotechnology
- Studies for building and construction machinery
- Advanced polymer and ceramic materials
- Process and Chemical Engineering
- Robotics and Artificial Intelligence
- Sensing images and computer processing
- Manufacturing technology

=== Research Centers ===
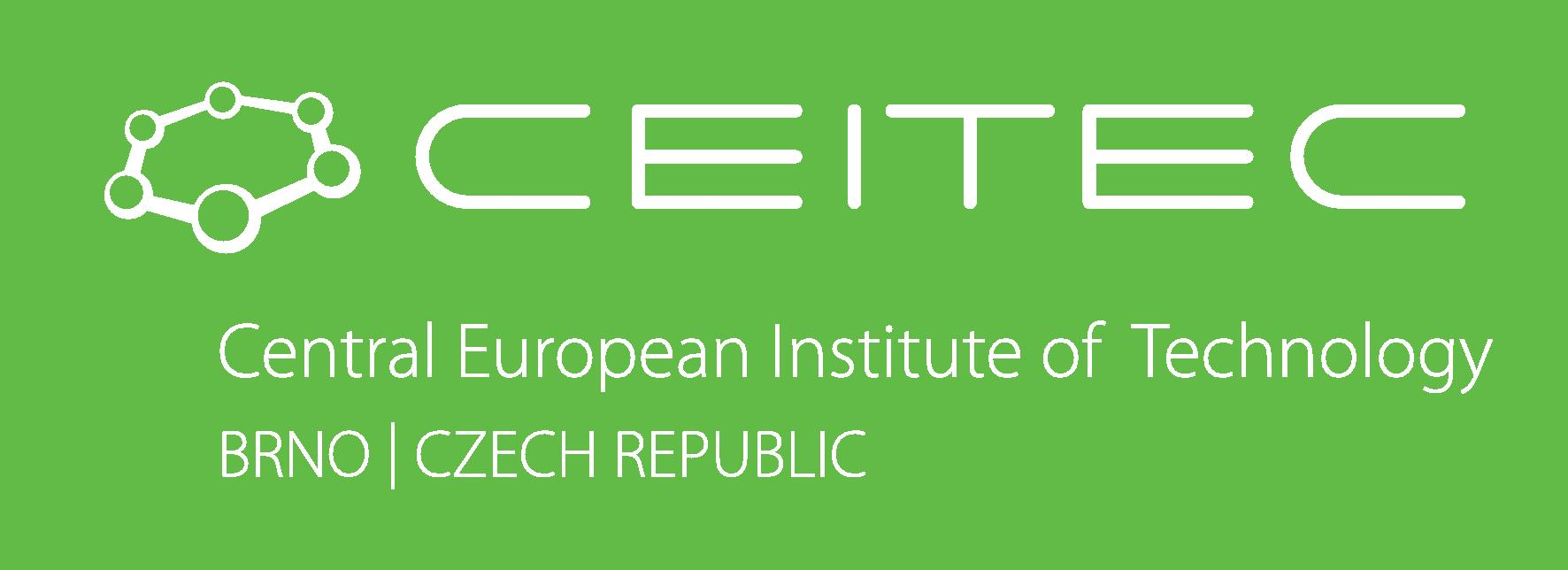
CEITEC

- AdMaS - advanced building materials, engineering and technology
- CEITEC - a center of excellence in biological sciences, materials and emerging technologies in cooperation of the Brno University of Technology and Masaryk University, Brno Mendel University, University of Veterinary and Pharmaceutical Sciences, Brno, Institute of Physics of Materials, Academy of Sciences and Veterinary Research Institute.
- Centre for information, communication and biomedical technologies
- Material Research Center in chemistry
- Centre for Research and utilization of renewable energy
- NETME Center - New Manufacturing Technology

=== Cooperation with industry ===
BUT cooperation with industry includes among others:

- innovation and the preparation of new degree programs in collaboration with industry
- direct cooperation in research and development companies in Czech Republic and abroad
- personal participation of experts on education process
- professional visits and internships
- contact point for cooperation between enterprises and the BUT is Technology Transfer Office

== Notable faculty and alumni ==
- Bohuslav Fuchs, Czech modernist architect
- Viktor Kaplan, Austrian engineer, inventor of the Kaplan turbine
- Jaromír Krejcar, Czech functionalist architect
- Vladimír List, Czech electrical engineer
- Félix Pollaczek, Austrian-French engineer and mathematician
- Armin Delong, Czech physicist, founder of electron microscopy in the former Czechoslovakia
- Norbert Troller, Czech and American architect and artist
- Otakar Borůvka, Czech mathematician
- August Košutić, Croatian politician
- Milan A. P. Harminc, Slovak architect and diplomat
- Peeter Tarvas, Estonian architect
- Otakar Diblík, Czech industrial engineer
- Tomáš Mikolov, Czech computer scientist
- Mirek Topolánek, Czech politician and business manager, 7th Prime Minister of Czech Republic
- Dan Ťok, Czech politician and business manager, former Minister of Transport of the Czech Republic
- Luděk Navara, Czech non-fictional author, publicist, scenarist and historian
- Jiří Löw, Czech urbanist and architect
- Radim Jančura, Czech businessman and entrepreneur, founder and CEO of RegioJet and Student Agency
- Michal Smola, former Czech orienteering athlete and Junior World Champion
- Zbyněk Stanjura, Czech politician, Minister of Transport of the Czech Republic
- Anna Hubáčková, Czech politician, former Czech Minister of the Environment and member of the Senate
- Petr Hlaváček, Czech researcher and university lecturer, expert in shoe technology
- Roman Onderka, Czech politician, former Mayor of Brno
- Zuzana Brzobohatá, Czech politician, former Member of the European Parliament
- Pavel Konzbul, Czech bishop
- Jan Sobotka, Czech politician, member of the Senate
- Martin Říman, Czech politician, former Czech Minister of Transport and Minister of Industry and Trade
- Zdeněk Škromach, Czech politician, former Czech Minister of Labour and Social Affairs
- Zdeněk Fránek, Czech architect
