= Milan A. P. Harminc =

Slovak architect and diplomat (1905–1974)

Milan Anton Pavol Harminc, also anglicized as Milan Anthony Paul Harminc (31 May 1905 – 1974), was a Slovak architect. He had an active career in architecture in what is today Slovakia in the 1930s, and worked on a number of high-profile projects there. During the summer of 1939 he briefly served as a diplomat for the Slovak Republic to the United Kingdom, but as World War II broke out he revolted against the Jozef Tiso government and sided with the Allies. He was a member of the Czechoslovak Council of State in exile during the war. Harminc migrated to Canada after the war, where he continued to work as an architect.

== Youth and interwar architectural career ==
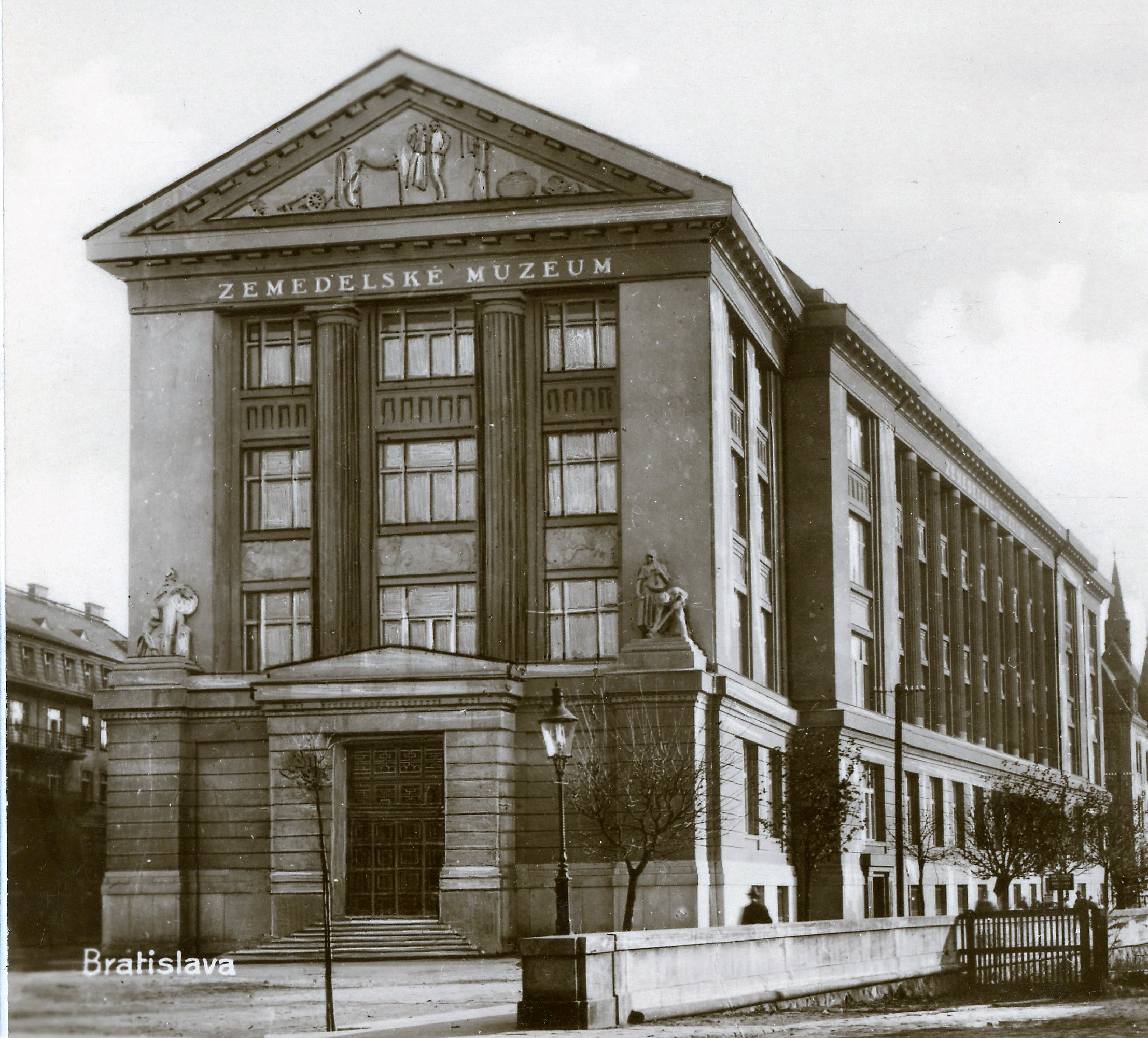
Slovak National Museum in Bratislava

Harminc was born in Žilina on 31 May 1905, the son of renowned architect Milan Michal Harminc. He went to school in Budapest and Bratislava, and obtained his baccalaureate in 1922. In 1930 he graduated with a diploma of architect–engineer from the Brno University of Technology, where he had been a student of Adolf Liebscher. He also studied national economy and law privately.

After leaving university he worked at his father's studio in early 1930s He collaborated with his father on several prominent projects such as the design of the Slovak National Museum in Bratislava. Pohaničová and Kiaček (2022) argued that although Harminc's "activities in the interwar architectural scene were brief, it can be assumed that he made significant contributions, especially in the design of healthcare buildings and his stylistic opposition to his father." In 1936 he established his own independent studio in Bratislava, located in House of the Slovak League on Grösslingová Street.

== Diplomatic career and World War II ==
After the Slovak Republic proclaimed independence in March 1939, Harminc was appointed to the Slovak Ministry of Foreign Affairs. Whilst he lacked diplomatic experience, he spoke several languages (Slovak, Czech, Hungarian, English, French and German) and had traveled significantly in Europe and North Africa. Moreover he was a personal friend of the Minister of Foreign Affairs Ferdinand Ďurčanský.

The United Kingdom had refused to recognize the new Slovak state. But in May 1939 the British government sent a consul to Bratislava and thereafter Ďurčanský selected Harminc as the Slovak consul-general in London. Harminc traveled to London in July 1939. After having arrived in London for his diplomatic posting, he was treated with suspicion by the British authorities. In the lead-up to the outbreak of World War II, the Slovak government recalled Harminc back to Bratislava but he refused to comply.

After the German invasion of Poland on 1 September 1939 (in which Slovak troops participated), Harminc would openly dissent and pledged allegiance to the exiled Czechoslovak president Edvard Beneš. On 26 September 1939, Harminc communicated to the British Foreign Office that "[t]he whole of Slovakia is occupied by Nazi armed forces. The voice of the Slovak people has been temporarily silenced by the ruthless abrogation of all treaties and agreements. In the name of Slovakia I solemnly protest against this shameful betrayal, and declare that the aim and ideals of Great Britain and France are identical with those of my sorely tried people."

Within the British authorities there had been some deliberations on expelling Harminc, but in the end he was allowed to remain in London as the Slovak consul considering that he had publicly sided with the Allies. The Czechoslovak Foreign Minister Jan Masaryk personally vouched for Harminc, which helped to sway the British authorities. In 1940 Harminc collaborated with the Czechoslovak National Council in Paris.

On 12 October 1941 Beneš appointed Harminc to the 35-member Czechoslovak Council of State. He remainded a member of the Council of State as of April 1943. Harminc served in the British military between 1943 and 1945.

== Migration to Canada ==
Harminc never returned to Slovakia after the war. He moved to Canada, where he worked as a city architect in Toronto. He died in Toronto in 1974.
