= Luděk Navara =

Czech writer, publicist and journalist (born 1964)

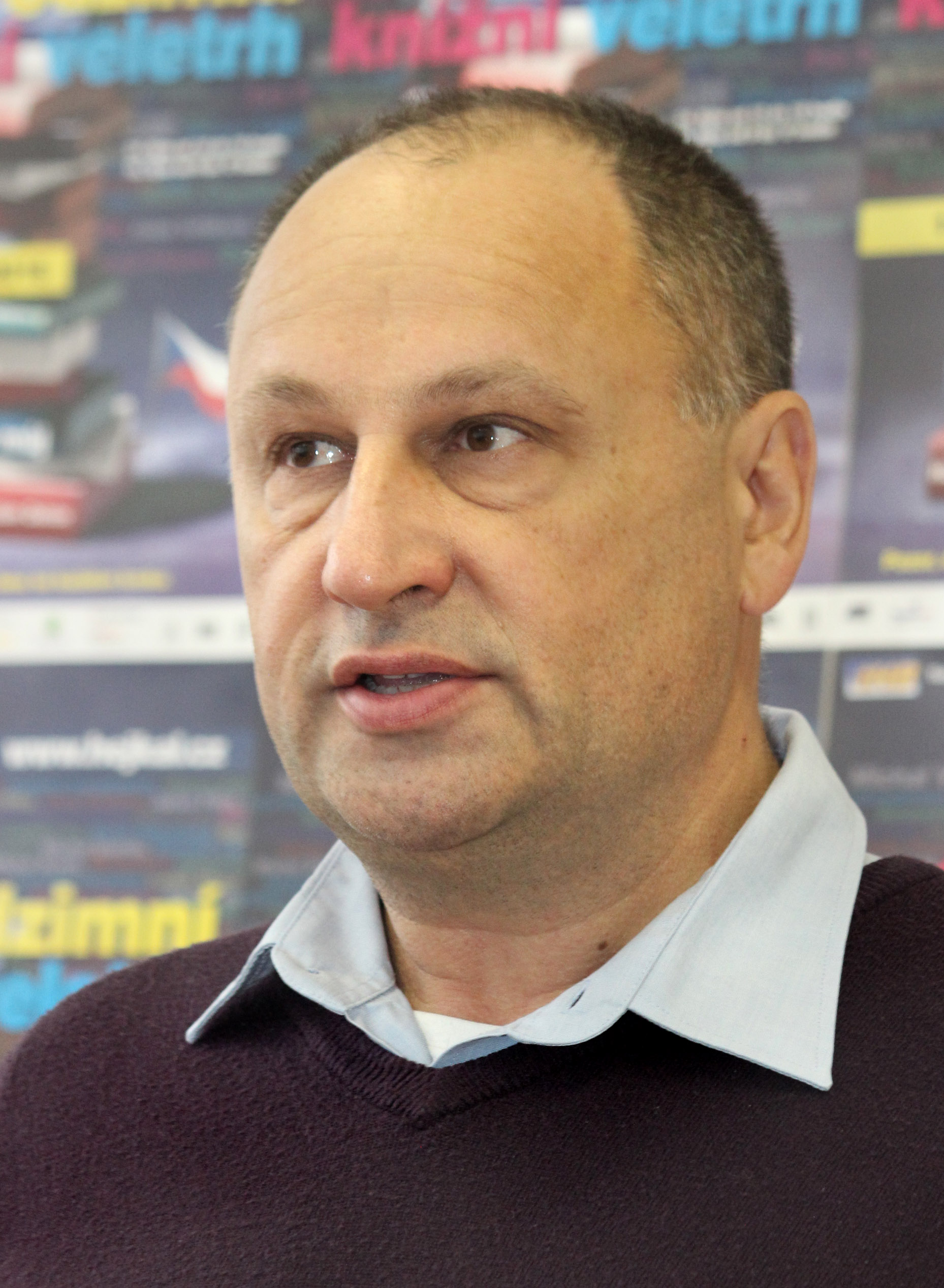
- Luděk Navara in 2016
- Born: April 26, 1964 (age 62); Brno, Czechoslovakia
- Occupations: non-fiction author, publicist, historian, journalist
- Employer: Mladá fronta DNES
- Known for: coverage of crimes of Communism and Nazism; research on the expulsion of Germans from Czechoslovakia; co-founder of the Civic Association Memory

Luděk Navara (born 26 April 1964) is a Czech non-fictional author, publicist and journalist.

== Biography ==
Navara was born on 26 April 1964 in Brno. He graduated at Faculty of Civil Engineering of Brno University of Technology and later in history at Faculty of Philosophy of Masaryk University. Since 1995, he has been editor by newspaper MF Dnes. He cooperates also with Czech Television in Brno. His predominant coverage of history and journalism are crimes of Communism and Nazism, and expulsion of Germans from Czechoslovakia. In 2009, together with Miroslav Kasáček, he founded the Civic Association Memory, which maps communist totalitarianism in the Czech Republic, especially in the South Moravian Region. The civic association Paměť initiated the establishment of the Freedom Trail and the Iron Curtain Gate to Freedom Memorial near Mikulov.

== Bibliography ==
=== Books ===
- Smrt si říká Tutter
- Příběhy železné opony
- Příběhy železné opony 2

=== TV documents ===
- A průvod Němců šel
- Odsunutý odsun
- Útěky železnou oponou
