= Schunk (surname) =

Schunk (or Schunck, Shunk) is a surname. Notable people with the surname include:

- Aaron Schunk (born 1997), American baseball player
- Dale Schunk, American educational psychologist, former Dean and current professor in the School of Education at the University of North Carolina at Greensboro
- Edward Schunck (1820–1903), British chemist
- Emily Schunk (born 1998), known online as Emiru, American Twitch streamer
- Harry Shunk (1924–2006), German photographer
- Ludwig Schunk, (1884–1947), German manufacturer
- Mae A. Schunk (born 1934), 45th Lieutenant Governor of Minnesota
- Nastasja Schunk (born 2003), German tennis player
- Pierre Schunck (1906–1993), Dutch resistance person
- Robert Schunk (born 1948), German operatic tenor
- Ross Schunk (born 1986), American soccer player

== See also ==
- Schunk Group
- Ludwig-Schunk-Stiftung
