= CRRC ZEMU03 =

Czech train

CRRC ZEMU03 CZ Class 665 "Sirius"
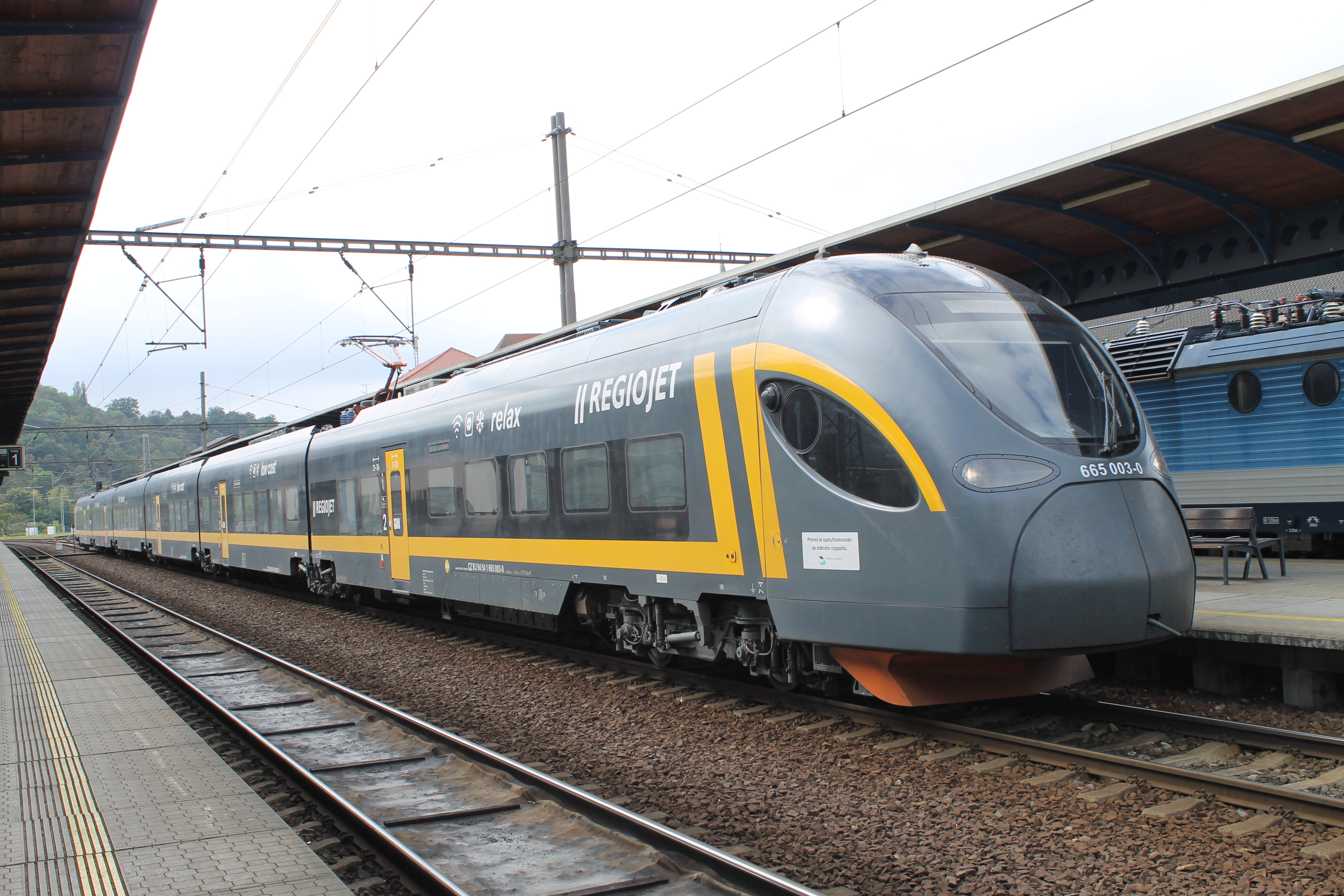
- Stock type: Electric multiple unit
- Manufacturer: CRRC Zhuzhou Locomotive
- Built at: CRRC ZELC Zhuzhou Plant, Hunan, China
- Constructed: 2019
- Entered service: 2024
- Number built: 3
- Number in service: 3
- Formation: 6 cars per set
- Fleet numbers: 665 001/002/003
- Owner: CRRC ZELC
- Operator: RegioJet
- Line served: R23

Specifications
- Train length: 111.5 metres (366 ft)
- Width: 2.86 metres (9.4 ft)
- Height: 4.3 metres (14 ft)
- Platform height: 550/760mm
- Wheel diameter: 850 mm new 780 mm worn
- Maximum speed: 160 kilometres per hour (99 mph)
- Weight: Max: 241,100 kilograms (531,500 lb)
- Axle load: Max: 18,474 kilograms (40,728 lb)
- Steep gradient: Max under PARK BRK: 40 ‰
- Acceleration: Max Avg: 1.38m/s²
- Electric systems: Overhead line; 25 kV 50 Hz AC; 3kV DC
- Current collection: Pantograph
- UIC classification: Bo’2’2’2’2’2’Bo’
- Safety systems: ERTMS: ETCS Baseline 3 Release 2 (CRRC TSC SigThemis CCO-600 V1.2.4); GSM-R Baseline 1 (funkwerk SW EDOR 1.1.1); NTC: Mirel VZ1 (CZ/SLO); Sifa
- Coupling system: Scharfenberg (Type 10)
- Multiple working: Maximum 2
- Track gauge: 1,435 mm (4 ft 8 1/2 in)

The CRRC ZEMU03, also known as Czech Republic Class 665 "Sirius", is an electric multiple unit (EMU) built by CRRC Zhuzhou Locomotive. The first customer of this type was the Czech Republic railway operator Leo Express (LE) The commercial operation with passengers began in 2024 with RegioJet (RJ). The type is registered with the Czech railway administration as Class 665.

== Naming ==
The ZEMU03 belongs the ZEMU family, to a series of electric multiple units (EMU) designed and manufactured by Chinese rolling-stock manufacturer CRRC Zhuzhou Locomotive for the European market under European Union TSI standards. Other variants include the ZEMU02 operated by the Austrian railway company Westbahn.

It also features a nickname "Sirius".

== Development ==
In 2016, Czech Republic private railway operator Leo Express (LE) ordered 3 units with an option for 27 more from CRRC ZELC for around 6 million Czech koruna, the original plan was to deploy these sets on the Prague-Ostrava-Krakow-Kosice long-distance services, in addition, new lines were planned from Prague to Pilsen, Děčín and Bratislava.

Two trains were shipped from China to Bremen in autumn 2019, assembled there and transferred by rail to the VUZ Velim test ring in the Czech Republic. The third unit initially remained with the manufacturer in Zhuzhou.

In the spring of 2022, Leo Express (LE) withdrew from the purchase contract after the Spanish companies Renfe and CAF had taken over the majority of shares in Leo Express. At the time, the certification process of the vehicles was about to complete. CRRC continued the type approval for the Czech Republic, Poland and Slovakia systems under the management of its own European subsidiary CRRC ZELC Verkehrstechnik, based in Vienna, at its own expense.

The private Czech railway company RegioJet (RJ) was then interested in taking over the three trains. In January 2024, a train completed a test drive on the public network on the Přerov-Otrokovice line for the first time. Later, a train ran on the express train line R23 between Kolín and Ústí nad Labem in regular operation. Between February and May 2024, unit 665 002 covered the 50,000 km required by the railway office there. In June 2024, tests were carried out under the European Train Control System (ETCS) on the Uničov-Olomouc-Červenka route.

In September 2024, CRRC and RegioJet (RJ) concluded a five-year lease. Then in the later November 2024, the third unit 665 003 was delivered via Hamburg and arrived on the 23rd December 2024 in the Czech Republic. The final approval for the operation of the trains in the Czech Republic is expected in 2025.

RegioJet (RJ) initially planned to deploy two trains on the express train line R23 Kolín–Ústí nad Labem hl.n., where they replaced locomotive-hauled trains. With this, RegioJet (RJ) fulfills a contract with the Czech Ministry of Transport, which provides for an operation with modern low-floor trains. Since the third train delivered in December 2024 did not yet certified by the authorities, a classic loco-hauled train had to continue to run there. Instead, new units of the pesa elf (series 655) have been driving since March 2025, which are intended for regional transport in the Prague Transport Association (PID) and also carry their corporate identity.

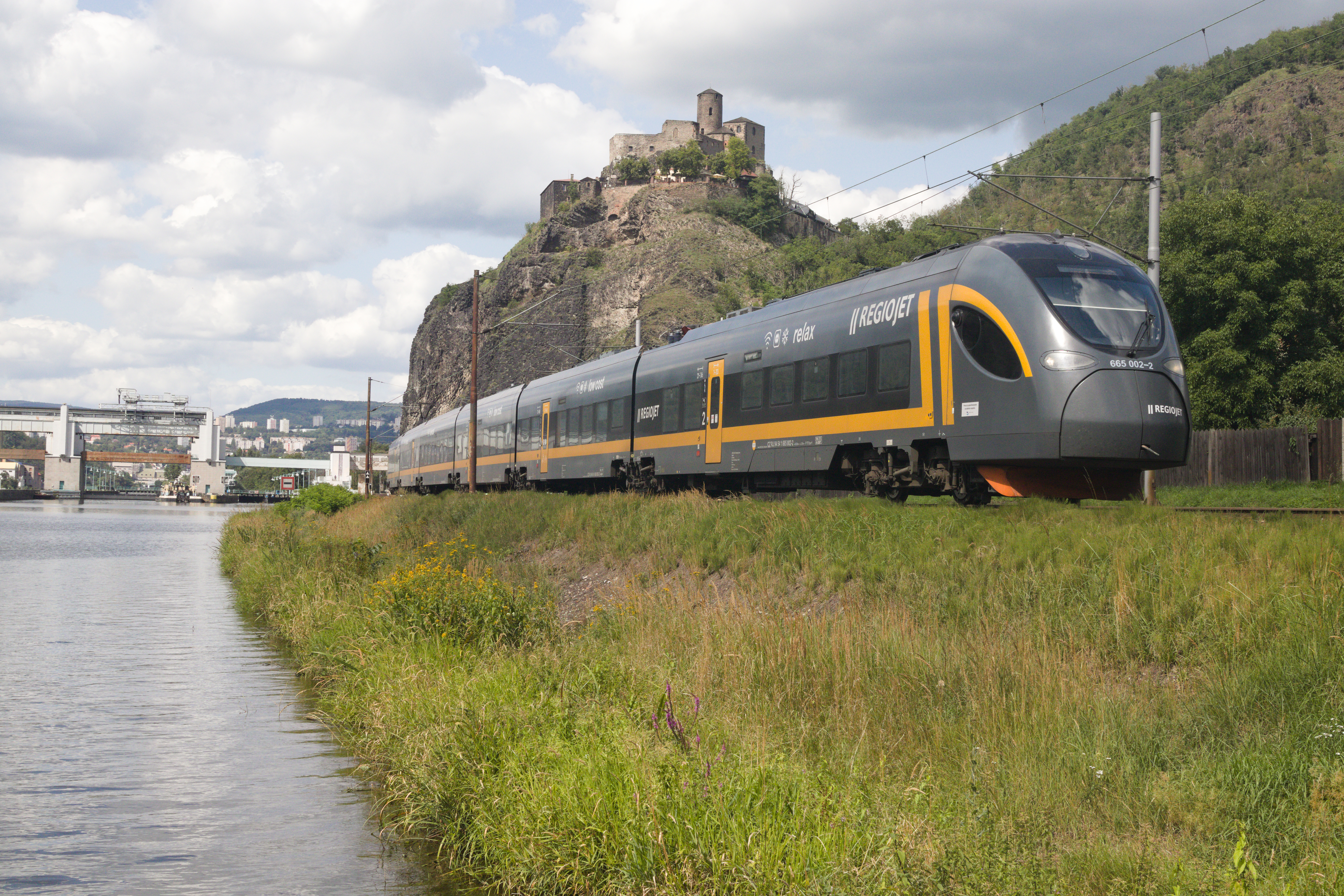
665 002 in August 2025 in RegioJet livery

The third and last unit (665 003) arrived via waterway in Port of Hamburg in 2025, and then transferred to HHLA’s terminal in O'Swaldkai and got assembled there, later transported to the Czech Republic. Since 9. April 2025, the third unit 665 003 will also be deployed in passenger service on line R23.

== Design ==
One ZEMU03 train set consists of a total of six cars, which are connected in the middle by Jacobs bogies. The two bogies under the end cars are powered. The end carriages are 22 meters long, the middle carriages are 16.8 meters each. The axle load of a fully occupied unit is up to 19 t for the bogies and up to 18 t for the bogies. The entry into the train is possible through five centrally operated, one meter wide sliding doors.

The passenger compartment is equipped with air conditioning, Wi-Fi, USB and 230 V sockets. There are a total of 314 seats, including 40 in First/Business Class.

The seating arrangement in the business class units behind the driver's cabs is 1+1, in the second class usually 2+2. A special feature is the additional total of 24 "seating places" in two cars of the 2nd class, passengers can sit on a small seat cushion at these seats and lean against a back cushion. Three rows of these standing seats take the place of two rows of ordinary seats.

Leo Express (LE) was involved in both the interior and color design of the trains, 20% of the components are supplied by local Czech companies.
