= R-469A =

Refrigerant mixture

R-469A is a refrigerant blend consisting of 35% carbon dioxide (R-744), 32.5% difluoromethane (R-32), and 32.5% pentafluoroethane (R-125).

== History ==
This blend was developed by TU Dresden and Weiss Technik (a member of the Schunk Group of companies). The impetus for the development thereof was the restriction in use of the refrigerant Fluoroform (R-23) by EU regulation 517/2014 on fluorinated greenhouse gases. At that time, R-23 was the refrigerant used most often to achieve temperatures as low as –70 °C. Since 2014, R-23 has only been allowed to be used in new refrigerating equipment and devices within the context of transitional regulations. This has led to a significant shortage of the quantity available and an enormous increase in price.

The aim of the project was to develop a new refrigerant suitable for temperatures down to –70 °C that fulfilled the requirements of the EU regulation and was neither flammable nor toxic. In 2019, the blend was registered with ASHRAE for the assignment of an R-number, which was allocated in the same year.

== Properties ==
Properties	Value
Composition	35% R-744 (CO_{2}); 32.5% R-32 (CH_{2}F_{2}); 32.5% R-125 (C_{2}HF_{5})
Average molar mass [g/mol]	59.1
Bubble point [°C]	−78.5
Dew point [°C]	−61.5

R-469A is a chemically stable, transparent and odourless gas mixture. Since it is non-toxic and non-combustible, it has been placed in safety group A1. The global warming potential (GWP) of R-469A is 1357 and thus less than 10% of the value for R-23 (GWP 14800). Thanks to the low GWP value, it fulfils the requirements of EU regulation 517/2014 on refrigerants for new systems even without the certificate of exemption otherwise necessary. Systems using the refrigerant R-469A up to 3.6 kg filling quantity are exempt from the Leak test in accordance with EU regulation 517/2014.

== Use ==
R-469A is used in climate simulation test chambers for reaching temperatures as low as –70 °C. It is used as a substitute for R-23. The properties of R-469A with regards to cooling rate, thermal compensation, and air distribution are almost identical to those of R-23. This makes the test results of systems using the two refrigerants directly comparable.

== Trade names ==
- WT69
