= Leo Express =

Czech railway and bus company

Leo Express Global a.s.

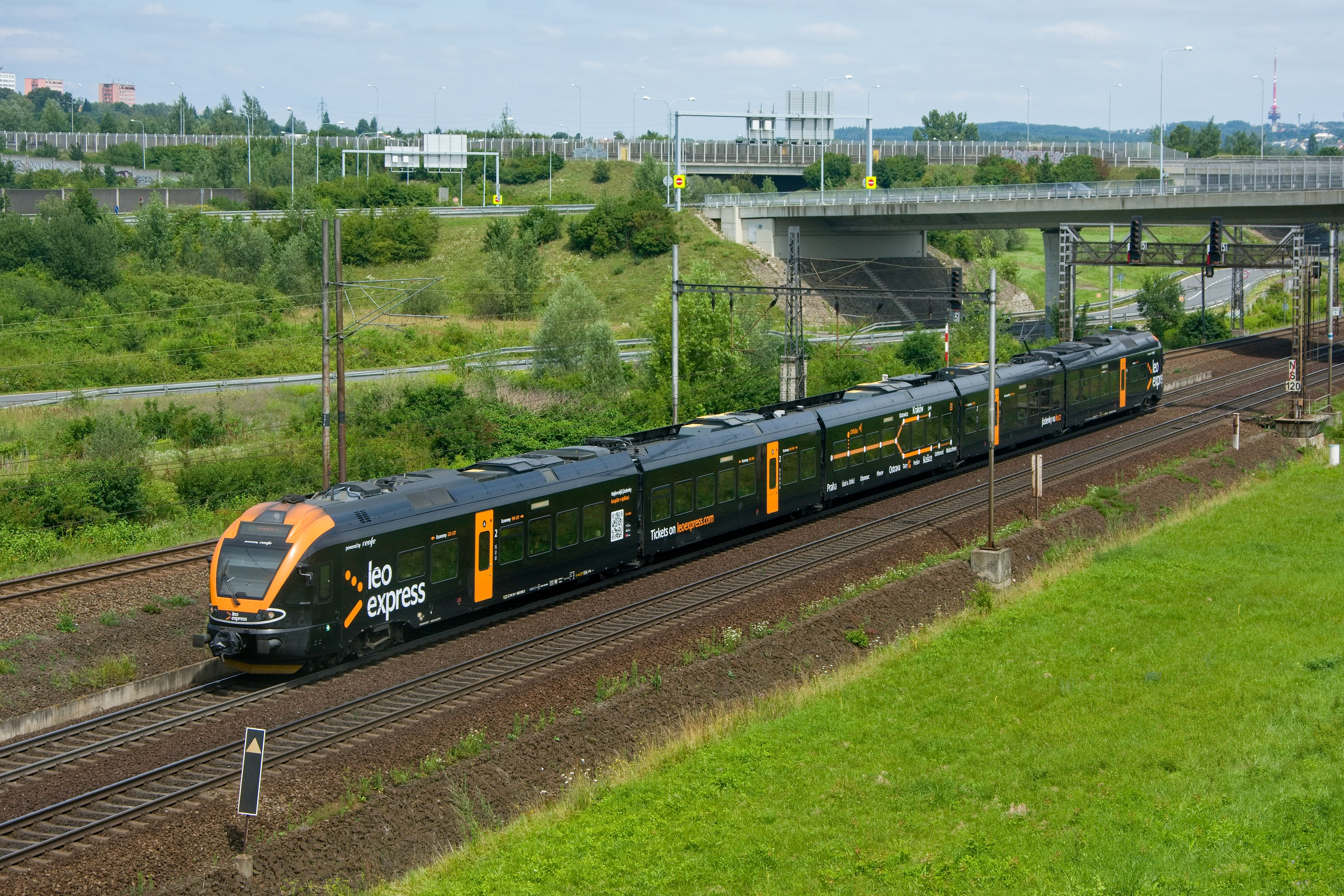
- CZ Class 480 of Leo Express
- Type: Joint-stock company
- Founded: 8 January 2010
- Founder: Leoš Novotný
- Headquarters: Prague, Czech Republic
- Area served: Czechia; Germany
- Key people: Peter Köhler (CEO); Martin Bala (Board); Leoš Novotný Jr.
- Products: Leo Express 232/235
- Services: Open-access operator
- Revenue: CZK 1 577 mio. (2019)
- Operating income: 180,811,000 Czech koruna (2019)
- Net income: CZK 144 mio. (2019)
- Total assets: CZK 525 mio. (2019)
- Total equity: CZK -298 mio. (2019)
- Owner: Renfe; EuroMaint AB; LEO Mobility s.r.o.
- Number of employees: 317 (2019)
- Subsidiaries: Leo Express Tenders s.r.o.; Leo Express s.r.o.; Leo Express Slovensko s.r.o.; Leo Express Maintenance s.r.o.
- Website: www.leoexpress.com

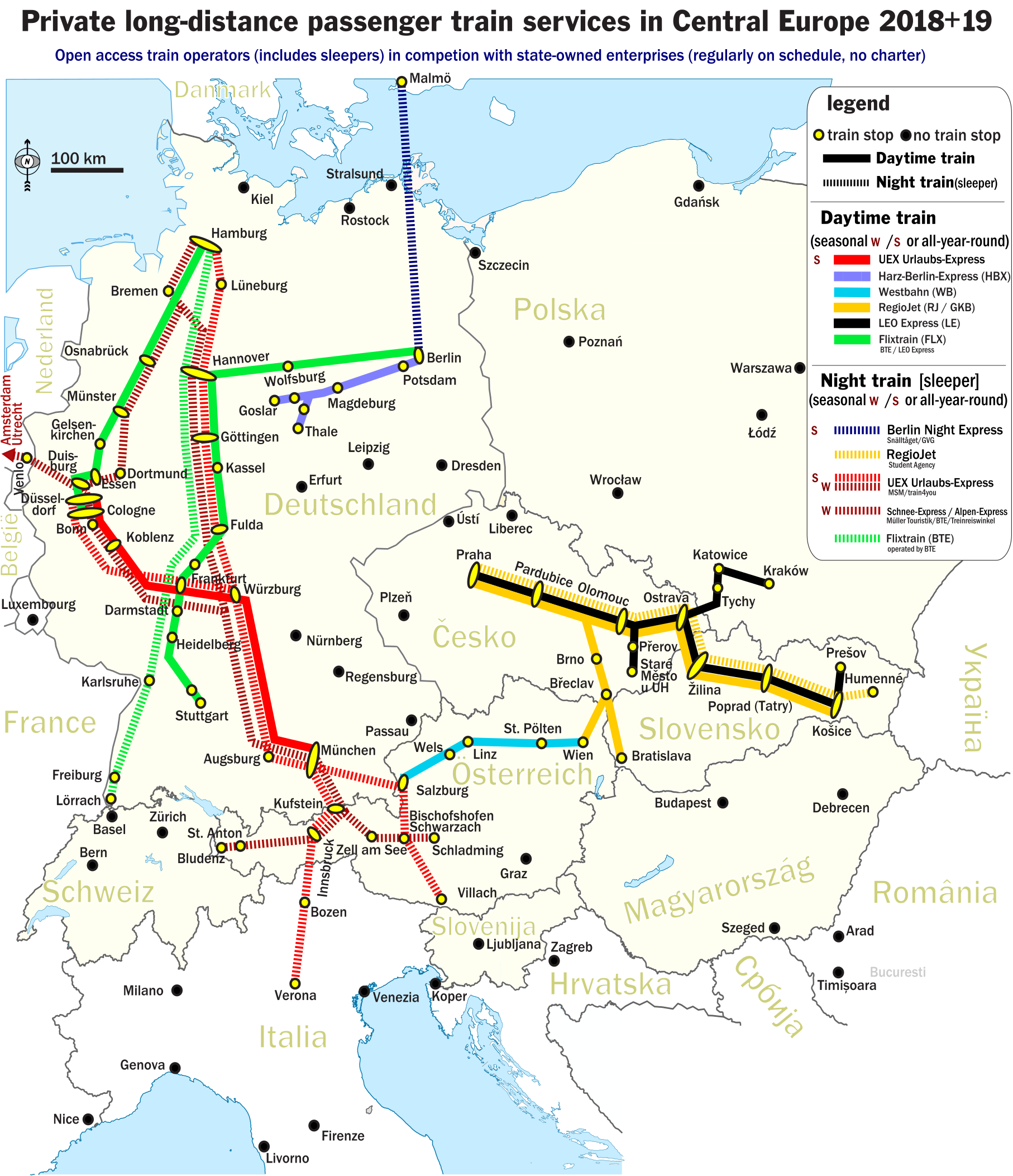
Connection map. Leo Express long-distance trains shown in black

Leo Express, formerly known as Rapid Express, is an open-access train operator in the Czech Republic, established in 2010. It launched inter-city services in November 2012 on the Prague–Ostrava route, on which state-owned operator Czech Railways and open-access operator RegioJet were already running trains.

The company runs train services between around 30 cities in the Czech Republic, Slovakia and Poland. The company also claims to run buses to Poland and South Bohemia.

== History ==
On 13 November 2012, a trial passenger service was launched by the company, with the launch of a full service having been scheduled for 9 December 2012. However, due to reported technical issues with the rolling stock, full services were delayed until 18 January 2013. Under this full service timetable, the company ran a regular service between Prague and Bohumín, calling in at Pardubice, Olomouc, Hranice, Přerov, Suchdol nad Odrou, Studénka and Ostrava. Additionally, a single service per day ran further to Karviná, Třinec, Český Těšín, Žilina, Poprad–Tatry and Košice in Slovakia. Within three years, Leo Express services had reportedly carried two million passengers.

In March 2015, the company announced a partnership with the rideshare specialist Uber in major cities. Via this partnership, Leo Express has implemented its concept of door-to-door public transportation, Uber drivers can be scheduled to pick up passengers from their homes and delivered to the nearest station, and vice versa. During September 2017, Leo Express partnered with the international ticket retailer Trainline, under which tickets for the former's services became available for purchase on the latter's sales channels. Shortly thereafter, Leo Express also formed a partnership with the German open-access operator FlixTrain to collaborate on services in the German market. On 26 April 2018, in partnership with Leo Express, FlixTrain launched its first service on the Berlin to Stuttgart route.

In October 2017, Leo Express was granted open-access rights for a service between Kraków and Prague; the approval made the company the first private operator of long-distance trains in Poland. On 20 December 2019, in cooperation with the Polish regional train operator Lower Silesian Railways, Leo Express commenced services between Prague and Wrocław; separately, at the time of the launch, the company had secured a permit from Polish authorities to operate a service between Krakow and Medyka on the country's border with Ukraine, and sought approval for another service between Kraków and Warsaw as well.

In April 2020, Leo Express was compelled to reduce or cancel many of its services, and public concerns over the future of the overall business were aired, as a consequence of the COVID-19 pandemic in the Czech Republic. Months later, the company resumed operation of its Czech, Slovakian and Polish services. During late 2021, it was announced that the partnership between Leo Express and FlixTrain had been dissolved, reportedly due to FlixTrain's temporary suspension of operations as a consequence of the COVID-19 pandemic and the economic damage that Leo Express sustained as a result; Leo Express stated its intention to seek new opportunities within the German market.

During November 2020, Germany's Federal Railway Authority (EBA) certified Leo Express to operate passenger services within Germany, either as an independent operator or through third parties. Accordingly, the operator became the only Czech carrier to have acquired this certification in Germany; it is the fourth country in which Leo Express is permitted to operate, in addition to the Czech Republic, Poland, and Slovakia. In March 2021, it was announced that the Spanish national operator Renfe was set to acquire a 50 percent stake in Leo Express; the operator stated that it sought to develop its business footprint outside of Spanish market. In August 2021, the acquisition was reportedly completed, making Renfe the primary partner in Leo Express.

In July 2022, Leo Express became unable to continue operating services between Nedakonice and Říkovice on the Břeclav–Přerov corridor due to its conversion from 3 kV DC to 25 kV AC electrification. Although the Flirt units are capable of being upgraded to support 25 kV AC operation, such an upgrade had not yet been performed. Instead, it has made use of free train capacity on the Prague–Bohumín route.

On 5 October 2026, Leo Express is discontinuing its long-distance service from Frankfurt via Thuringia and Prague to eastern Poland after just a few months.

== Trains ==
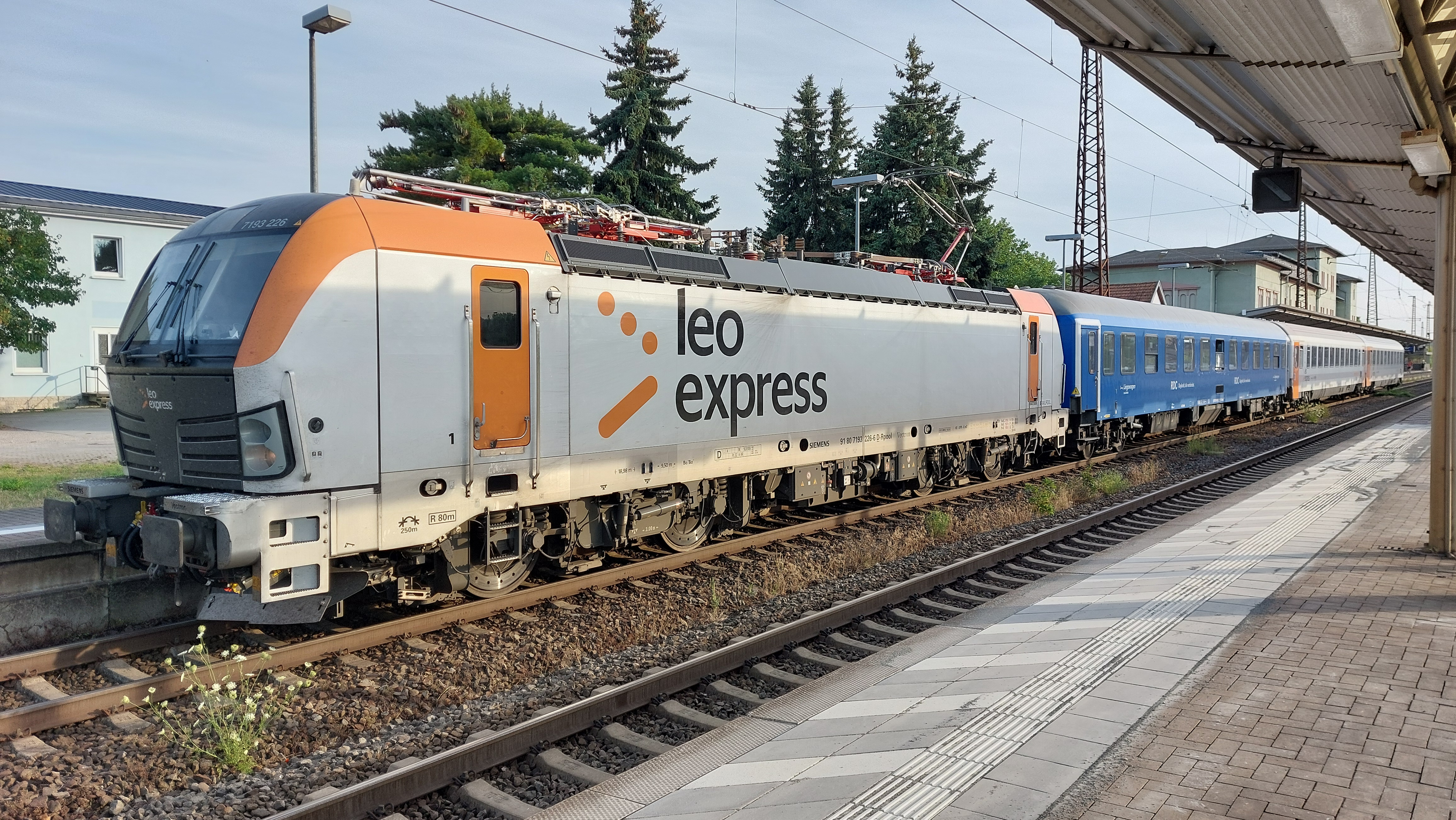
International Leo Express 232/235 train from Frankfurt am Main, Germany to Bohumín, Czechia

Initially, Leo Express operated five Stadler FLIRT five-car electric multiple units, which have been specially adapted to perform long-distance services. These have been claimed by the company to provide the fastest acceleration of any train operating in the Czech Republic, achieved via its modern and lightweight design and relatively powerful engines; these are also capable of attaining the maximum national speed of 160km/h. The interior has been designed for intercity travelers, and has been configured to provide three travelling classes: Economy, Business and Premium. In Premium Class, the seats are foldable to a sleeping position. Various amenities are present on these trains, including full air conditioning, Wi-Fi coverage, information and entertainment systems, onboard catering, ecologically closed toilets, wheelchair-accessible facilities, and daily newspapers and magazines. The livery used by Leo Express is predominantly black with golden details, along with the company's white logo being placed in prominent locations. On 5 February 2012, the first of these trains was formally delivered to the company.

On 27 September 2016, Leo Express signed an order for CRRC Zhuzhou Locomotive to supply three electric multiple unit trains in mid-2018; the arrangement includes a framework agreement for up to 30 more which would be delivered between 2019 and 2021. At the time, this order was stated as supporting the operator's plans to expand beyond the Czech Republic and Slovakia. However, in April 2022, reports emerged that Leo Express had cancelled its contract with CRRC for the CRRC ZEMU03, after undergoing two years of testing but failing to achieve certification based on European TSI regulations to allow operation.

As of 2023, Leo Express announced intentions for a night train service from Oostende on the Belgian coast to Bratislava. This service would run daily from 13 December 2026 and stop in 50 intermediate stations including Prague, Dresden, Magdeburg, Hannover, Düsseldorf and Brussels.

== Buses ==
Leo Express operates a fleet of black livery buses between Bohumín (Silesia), Katowice and Kraków (Poland) which run twice per day. In June 2015, the operator introduced a new network branded LEO Express Easy, which runs connections between Prague, Tábor, České Budějovice and Český Krumlov as well as between Košice, Michalovce, Uzhhorod and Mukachevo. The company's bus timetables are integrated with their train timetables.

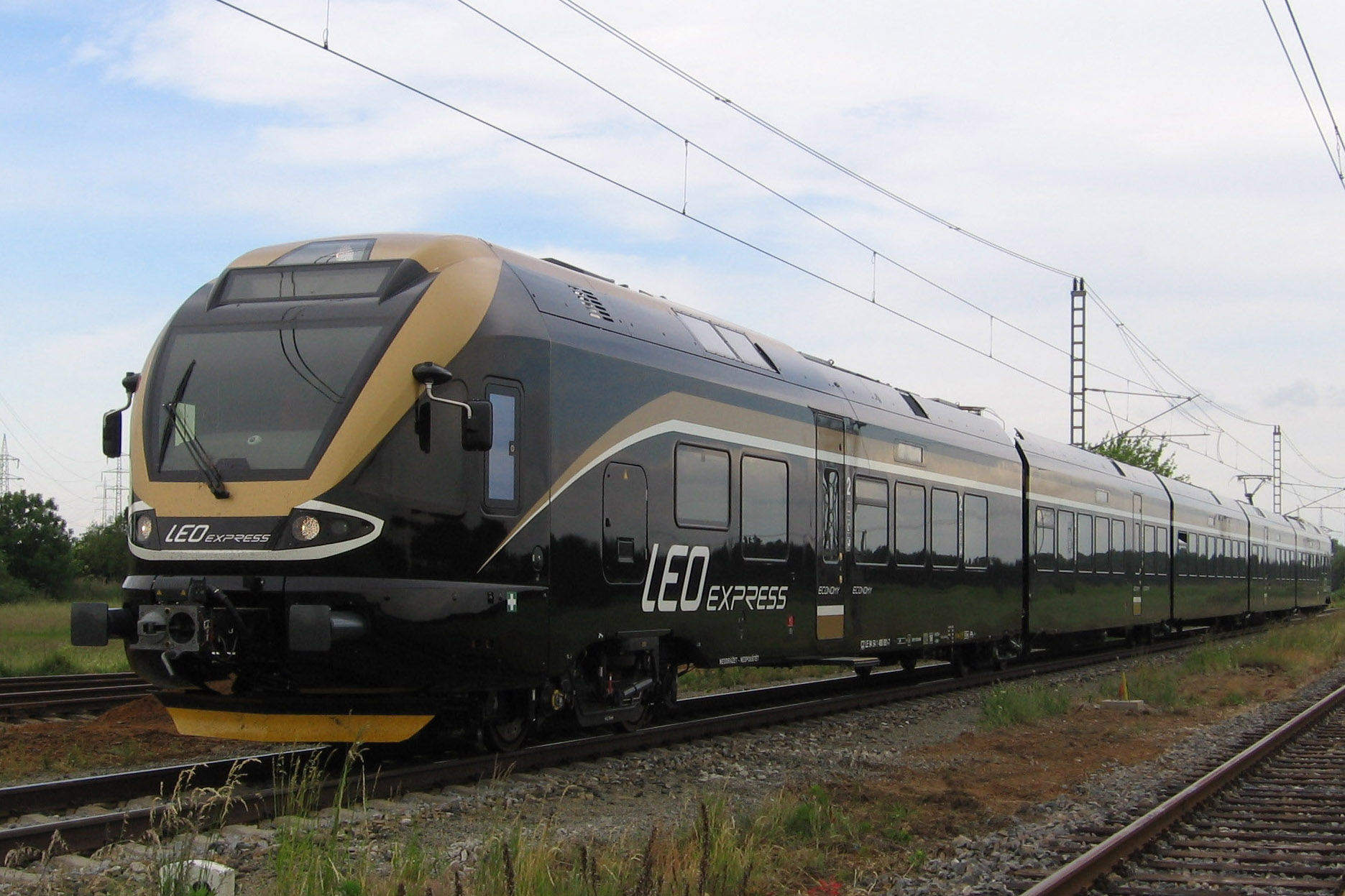
Stadler FLIRT in Leo Express livery

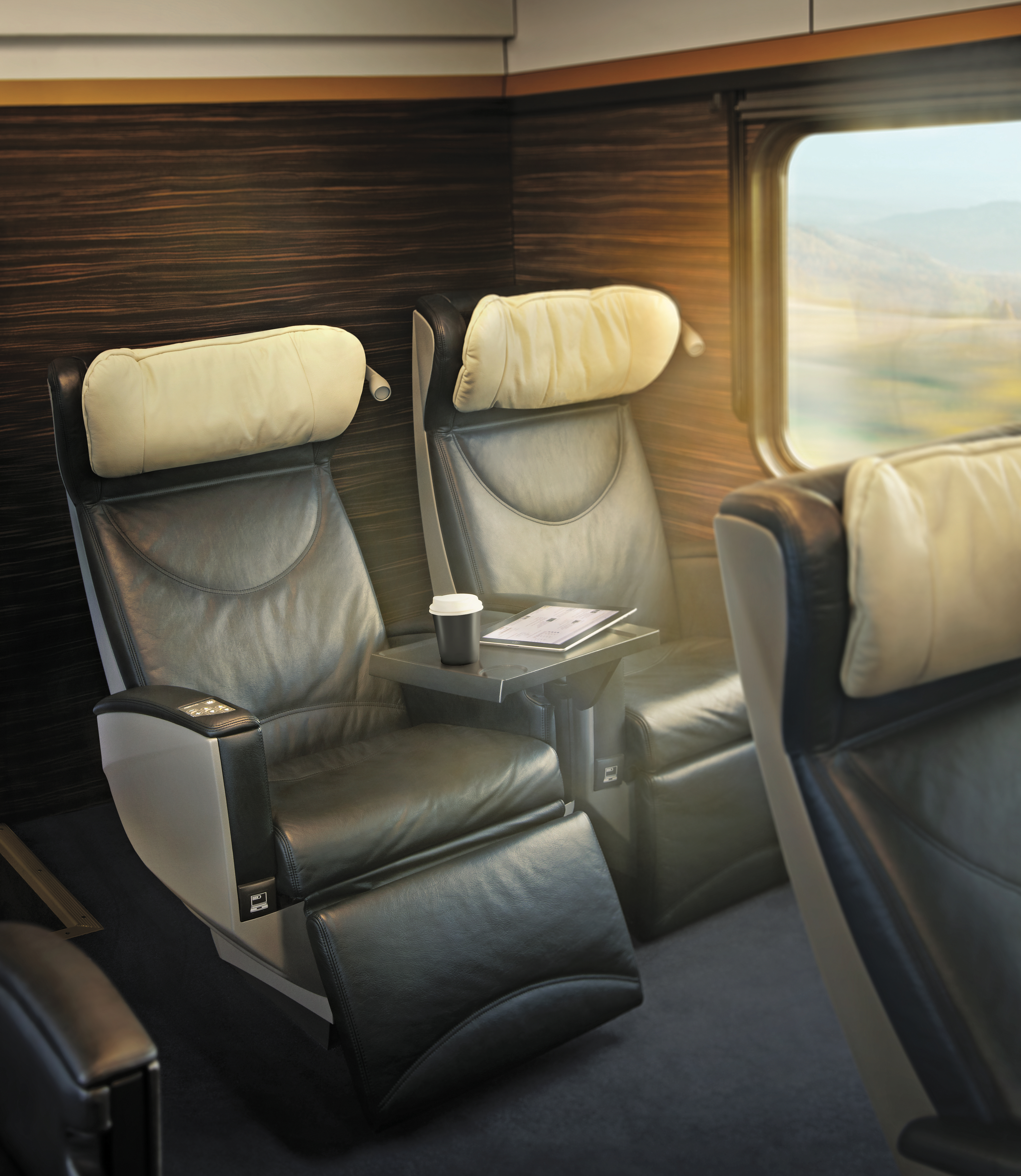
Interior of Premium Class

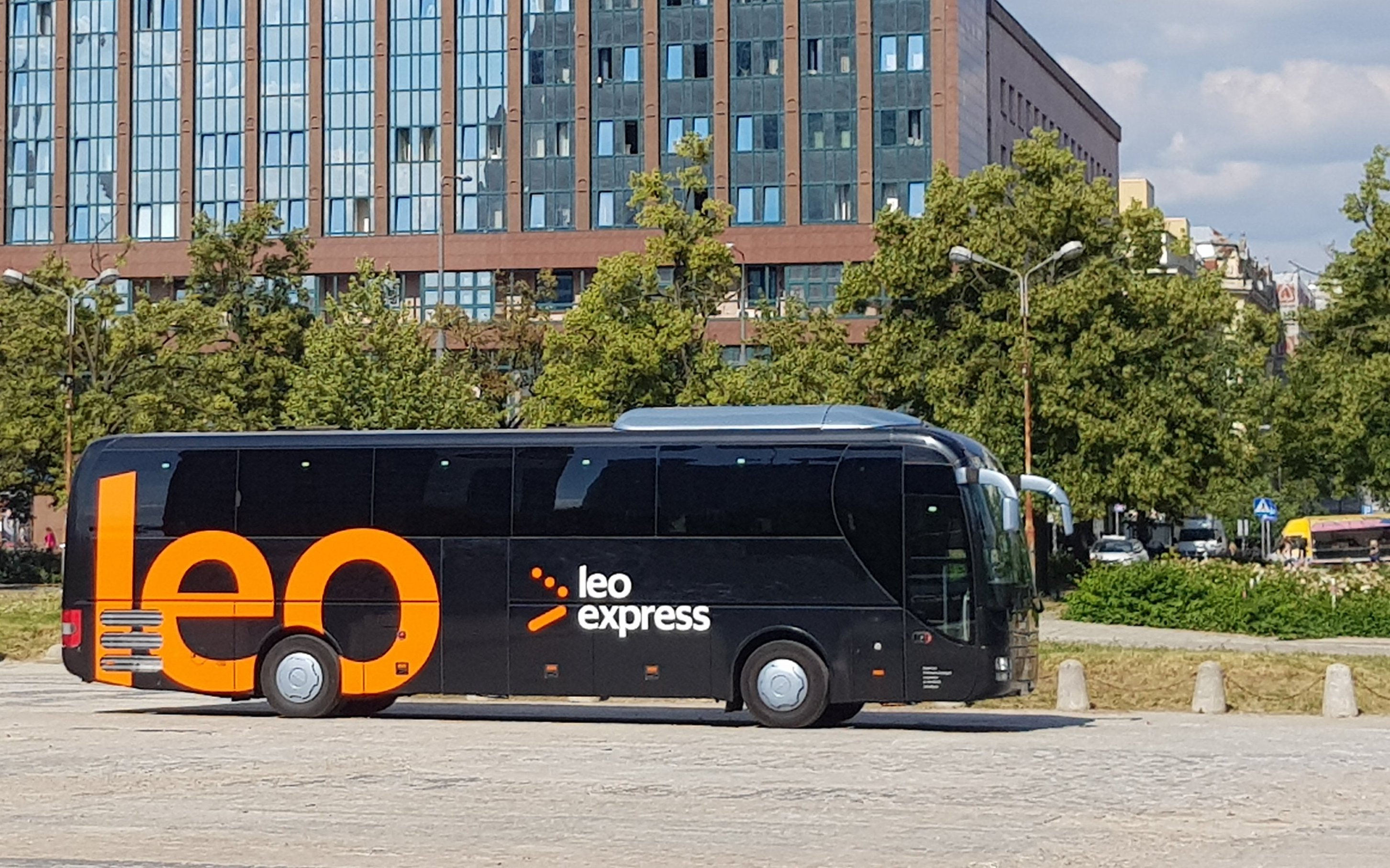
Leo Express bus

== See also ==
- WESTbahn, another open-access operator, in Austria
- RegioJet, another Czech open-access operator
