= CRRC ZEMU02 =

High-speed double-decker train

CRRC ZEMU02 Westbahn Class 4100 “Panda”
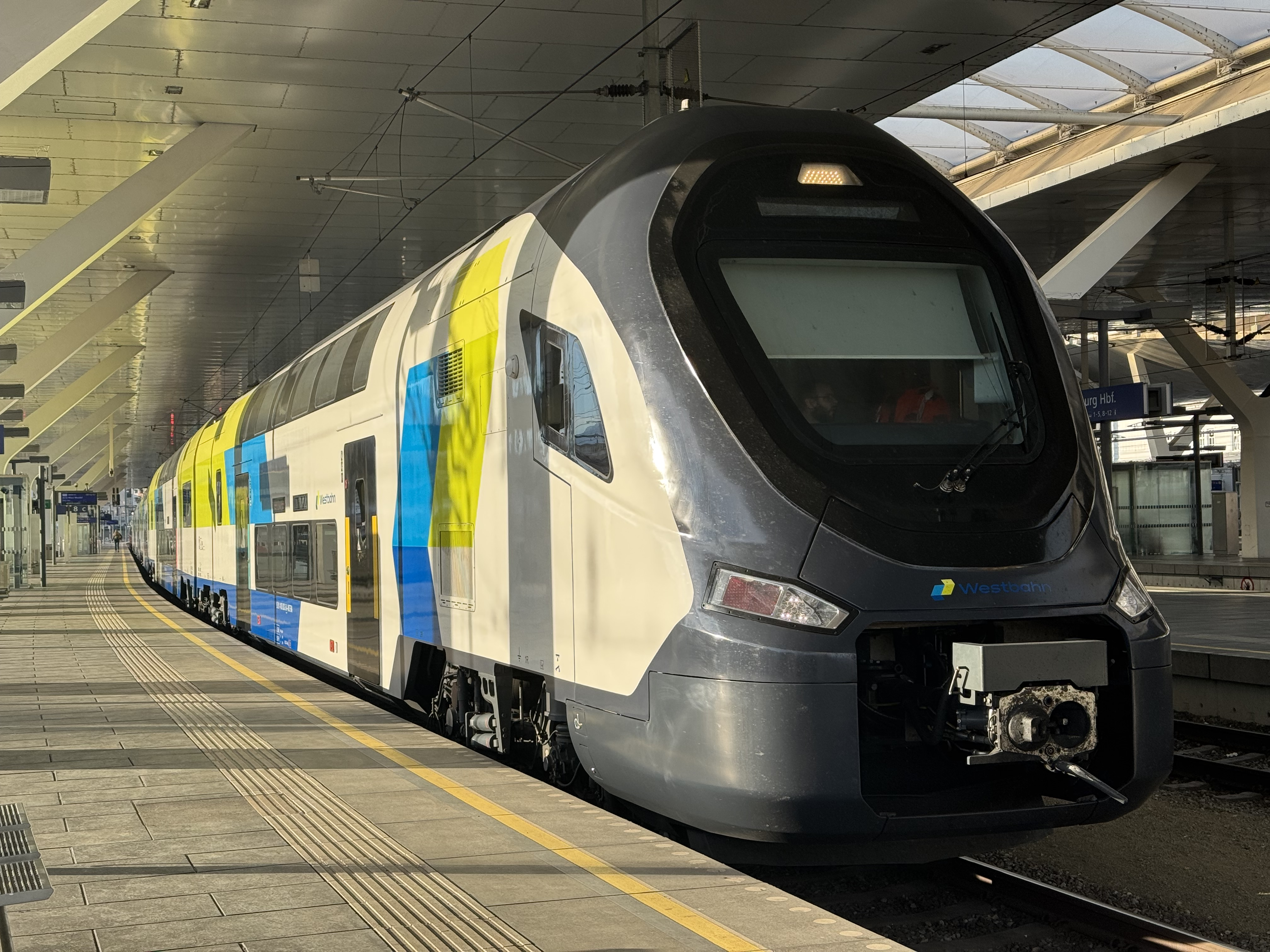
- 4100 003 in Salzburg Main Station

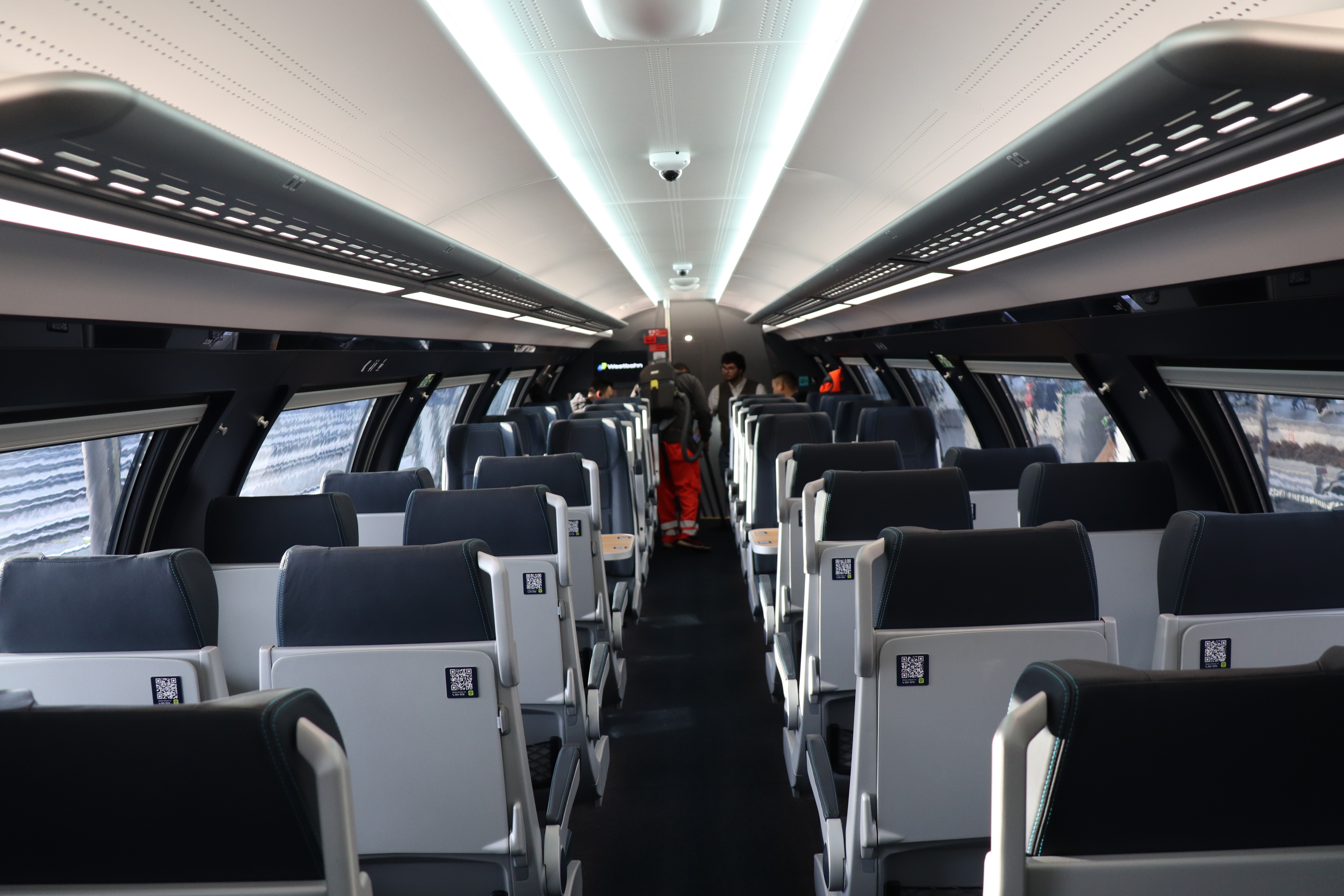
- Upper deck 2nd class of 4100 003
- Stock type: Electric multiple unit
- Manufacturer: CRRC Zhuzhou Locomotive
- Built at: CRRC ZELC Zhuzhou Plant, Hunan, China
- Family name: CRRC DDEMU
- Constructed: 2021-2022
- Entered service: 2025
- Number built: 4
- Number in service: 4
- Predecessor: CRRC DDEMU1
- Formation: 6 cars per set
- Fleet numbers: 4100 001-004
- Capacity: 536 seats, 1280 maximum
- Owner: CRRC
- Operator: Westbahn
- Line served: Wien Wbf - Salzburg

Specifications
- Car body construction: Aluminum, Carbon fibre, Glass fibre
- Train length: 158 metres (518 ft)
- Car length: End car: 27,700 millimetres (90.9 ft); Middle car: 25,650 millimetres (84.15 ft)
- Width: 2,800 millimetres (9.2 ft)
- Platform height: 380/550/760mm
- Doors: 24 total, 12 each side
- Wheel diameter: Min: 850mm
- Maximum speed: 200 kilometres per hour (120 mph)
- Weight: Max: 416,090 kilograms (917,320 lb)
- Axle load: Max: 19,520 kilograms (43,030 lb)
- Steep gradient: Max under PARK BRK: 40 ‰
- Deceleration: Max Avg: 1.22m/s2
- Electric systems: Overhead line; 25 kV 50 Hz AC; 15 kV 16.7 Hz AC
- Current collection: Pantograph (Schunk WBL 32.05, 1950mm)
- UIC classification: Bo′Bo′+2′2′+2′2′+2′2′+2′2′+Bo′Bo′
- Minimum turning radius: 150m
- Braking system: Knorr-Bremse
- Safety systems: ERTMS: (VR1.0); ETCS Baseline 3 Release 2 (CRSC ETCS-400T); GSM-R Baseline 1 (funkwerk MESA 26 BASE 02.01.32); NTC: Mirel VZ1 (H/CZ/SLO); LZB L72 (Germany & Austria); PZB 90 (Germany & Austria); Sifa
- Coupling system: Scharfenberg (Type 10)
- Headlight type: Light Emitting Diode
- Track gauge: 1,435 mm (4 ft 8 1/2 in) standard gauge

The CRRC ZEMU02, also known as CRRC DDEMU2 or Westbahn Class 4100 “Panda”, is a high-speed bi-level electric multiple unit (EMU) built by CRRC Zhuzhou Locomotive for Austrian railway company Westbahn.

It is designed to meet the TSI standards of the European Union (EU) and is configured as 6-car set. It is also equipped with a dual AC drive system and multiple signaling systems to meet the transportation needs of operating in Austria, Germany, Switzerland, Slovakia and Hungary.

== Naming ==
It is designated as ZEMU02, the second member of a series of electric multiple units (EMU) made by CRRC ZELC for the European market, or Class 4100 by the European rail authorities and DDEMU2, an acronym for "Double-Deck Electric Multiple Unit 2" by its manufacturer CRRC ZELC, which is a wholly owned subsidiary of the Chinese state owned railway manufacturer CRRC.

It is the successor of the CRRC ZELC’s concept double-decker high-speed EMU project DDEMU1.

The Class 4100 is also named “Panda” by the operator Westbahn.

== History ==
=== Bidding ===
In 2019, CRRC ZELC bid for a contract to supply a complete fleet of trains to Westbahn, in order to replace its fleet of Stadler KISS 1 and Stadler KISS 2 which was sold to DB Fernverkehr (later to ÖBB-Personenverkehr) to complete its modernization of the Intercity rolling stock pool.

However, it was later announced that Westbahn chose Stadler Rail to supply and maintain a fleet of 15 6-car KISS 3 double decker EMUs, which is the third contract so far the manufacturer has signed with the railway company.

=== Development and testing ===
The first ZEMU02 in full Westbahn colors was unveiled in China on May 31, 2021, with a rollout ceremony held at the CRRC ZELC factory in Zhuzhou, Hunan province of China. The CRRC president Sun Yongcai, together with the CEO of WESTbahn Erich Forster and the Chinese ambassador Li Xiaosi attended the ceremony remotely due to the COVID-19 pandemic policies with Sun in Beijing, Forster and Li in Vienna.

On July 26, 2021, the first ZEMU02 leaves CRRC ZELC factory in Hunan and started its journey to Germany.

On June 22, 2022 the Class 4100 made its first test run on the tracks in VUZ Velim, a rolling stock testing facility in Cerhenice, Czech Republic, to determine that it meets the conditions to run on the test line, before being prepared to undergo vehicle acceptance testing.

It is also reported that Westbahn will lease these EMUs to supplement its fleet of 15 6-car Stadler KISS 3 that were ordered in 2019.

In 2023, Class 4100 begins its testing process on public tracks in Germany and Austria, being seen at multiple locations including DB Systemtechnik site in Munich, Germany and among the west railway in Austria.

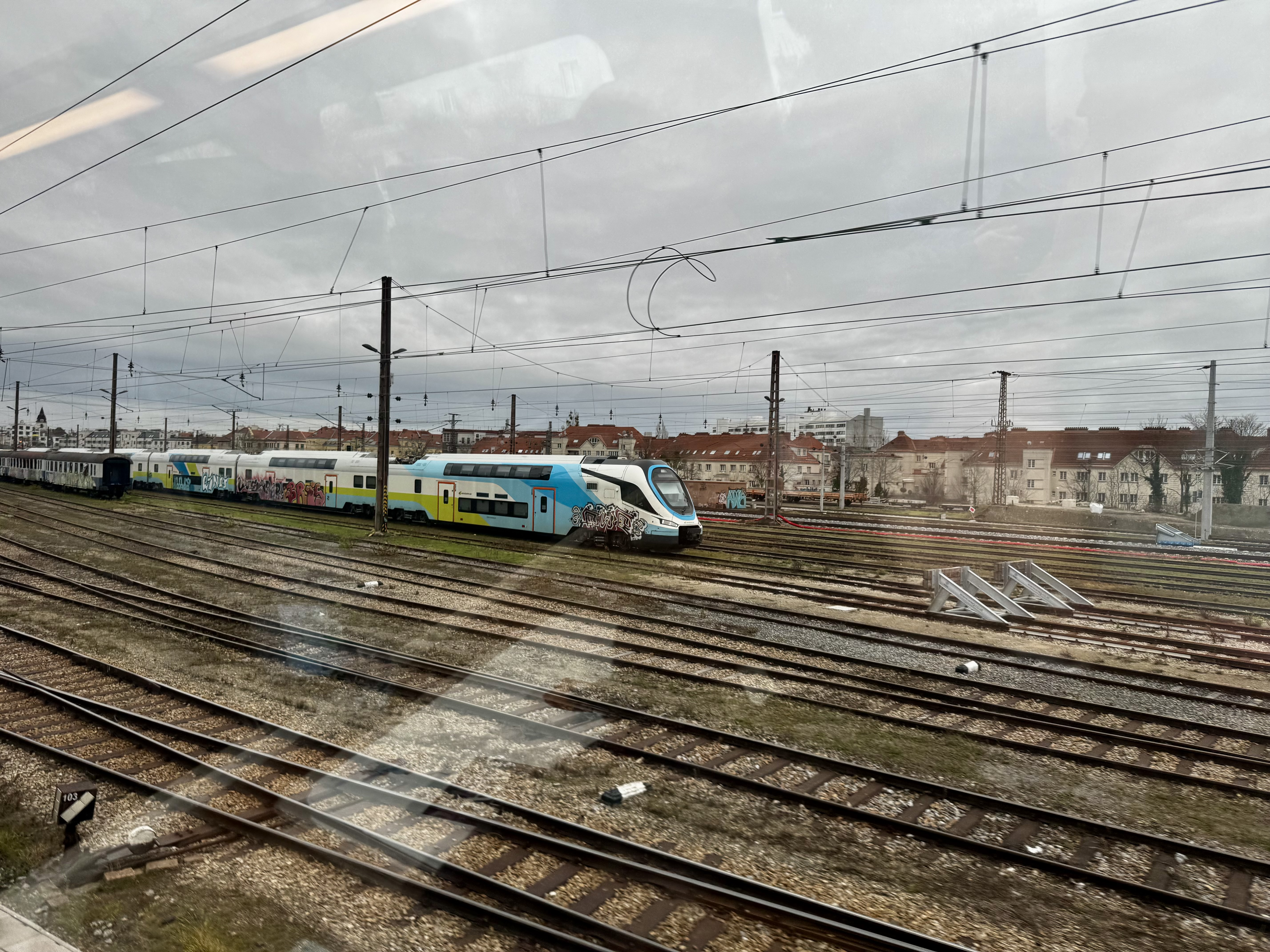
4100 002 stored outside of Wien Westbahnhof

In September, 2024, it is reported that CRRC ZELC has partnered with Hungarian company Acemil to build a new rolling stock manufacturing facility in Hungary. The main targets are mainline locomotives, shunting locomotives, electric multiple units (EMU) and double decker cars.

It is also reported that apart from the main deal, CRRC Shandong, another branch of the state-owned CRRC, signed an agreement with Acemil to build freight wagons in the new plant.

=== Entry into service ===
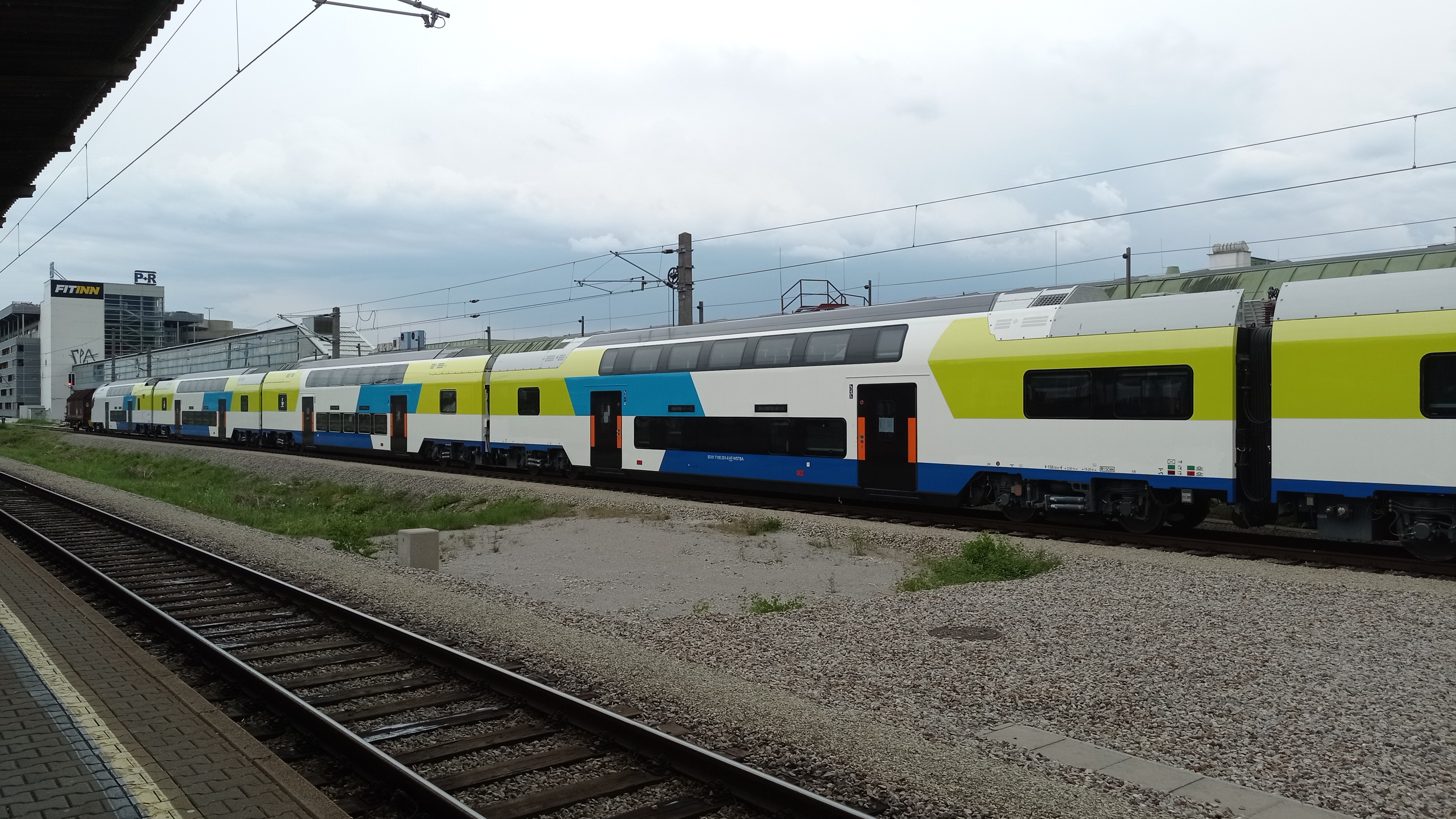
4100 001 with the new corporate design in Vienna Hütteldorf

On November 1st, 2025, Westbahn presented the Class 4100 in the operator’s new outside design to the press and public at Vienna west station.

The Class 4100 is named “Panda” with its first operator Westbahn and will be put into service on the Austrian west railway for a mixed operation with the Stadler KISS 3 trains before the timetable change at the end of the year, increasing the density of Westbahn traffic between Vienna west station and Salzburg main station from 60 to 66 daily.

On November 6th, 2025, the ZEMU02 received its official type certificate from the European Union Agency for Railways (ERA).

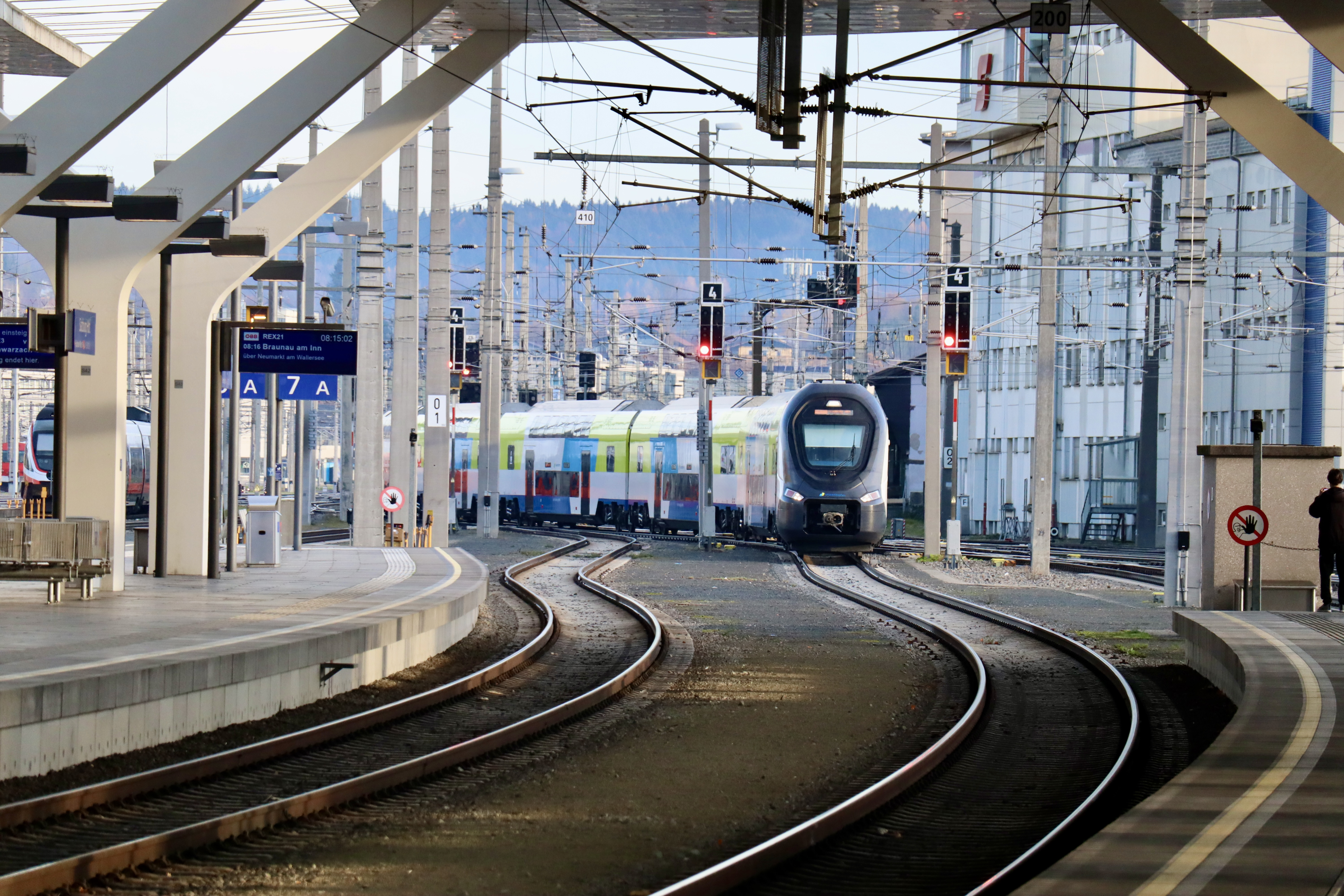
4100 003 entering Salzburg main station as WB 900 on platform 8

On November 12th, 2025, Westbahn started "Panda" ZEMU02's revenue passenger operations with the WEST 900 service departed from Vienna West Station to Salzburg Main Station.

=== Expansion ===
On June 19th, 2026, 6 months after its first commercial service, the ZEMU02 expanded its operation into Germany with the WEST/WB 964 and WEST/WB 967 services from Vienna West Station to Munich Central Station and back. Regular border-crossing services with the ZEMU02 are planned to start on August 3rd.

== Features ==
=== Frame ===
The ZEMU02 is designed with a light-weight aluminum body shell that incorporate composite materials including high-strength carbon fiber and glass fiber elements.

=== Mechanical System ===
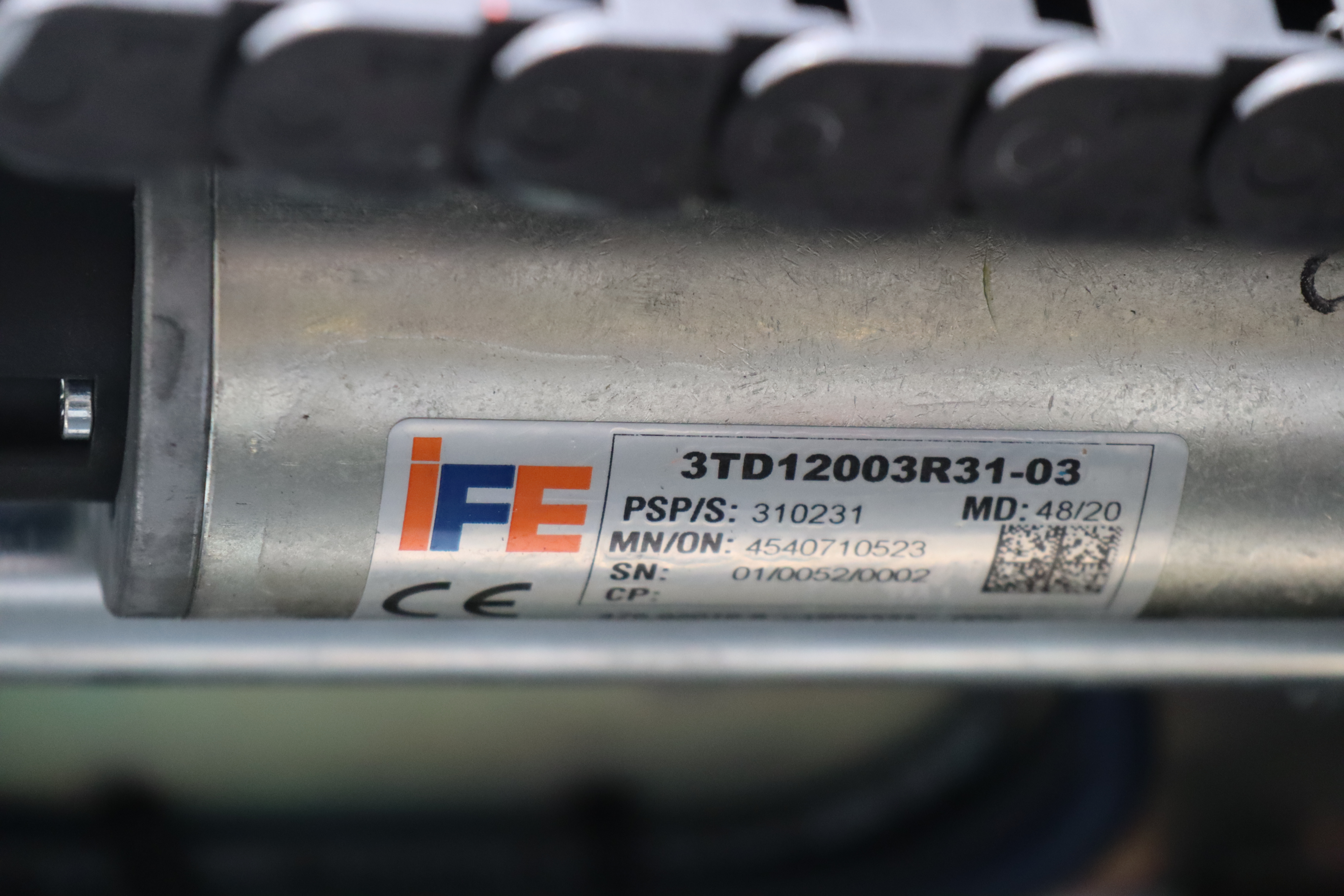
iFE door mechanisms on 4100 003

The bogies are supplied by CRRC ZELC, doors from German manufacturer Knorr-Bremse’s Austrian iFE door division and braking system also from the Knorr-Bremse brakes division.

=== Electrical System ===
The CRRC ZEMU02 is equipped with tPower series water & wind-cooled traction inverter from Zhuzhou CRRC Times Electric Co., Ltd. The system consumes 10% percent less energy compares to the Stadler KISS 3 family in similar size and market.

It is equipped with two AC pantographs supplied by the German manufacturer Schunk Group, with the model WBL 32.05. It has a contact width of 1950mm, suitable for operating on AC lines in Germany, Austria, Czech Republic, Hungary and Slovakia.

=== Interior ===
Being equipped with both first and second class seating, the 6-car set is able to offer 536 seats, but with its maximum capacity, it can hold 1280 passengers.

Each middle-car (12, 13, 14 and 15) has a self-service bistro section branded as WestCafé, equipped with Spanish Azkoyen vending machine and a Swiss-made coffee machine from Rex-Royal, as is typical among the Westbahn standard cabin. The carpet was supplied by Forbo Flooring Austria and was assembled in China. There are also wheel chair spaces and bicycle storage zone installed.

Onboard Wi-Fi network is also selected to ensure a better passenger experience and access for ticket sales and seat reservation system for the staff.

=== Cab ===
Driver’s desk with standard TSI layout

The driver’s room is designed under the latest TSI (Technical Specifications for Interoperability) standard. A typical standardized European control desk layout can be seen in front of the driver’s seat.

Multiple signalling systems are installed to ensure operations across Germany, Austria, Hungary and Slovakia, China Railway Signal & Communication (CRSC) supplied its ETCS-400T (v2.1.4.0) on board system with certified ETCS Baseline 3 Release 2 (SRS v3.6.0) software capability for upgraded ETCS equipped lines in Europe.

It is also equipped with Funkwerk AG’s MESA 26 digital radio module with software version BASE 02.01.32, which enables GSM-R Baseline 1 capabilities.

Other national train control (NTC) systems include LZB L72 and PZB 90 for conventional lines in Austria and Germany, Mirel VZ1 on board device for Hungary (EVM120), Czech Republic and Slovakia (LS90).

== Variants ==
=== Westbahn Class 4100 ===
The initial version of CRRC DDEMU2, first rolled out in May 2021, entered service in November 2025.

== Orders ==
Customer	Country	Quantity	Details	Remarks
WESTbahn Management GmbH	Austria	4	6-car set, 200km/h	leased, option for buying

== See also ==
- Rail transport in Austria
- CRRC ZEMU03
