= Leo Express 232/235 =

Night train service in Europe

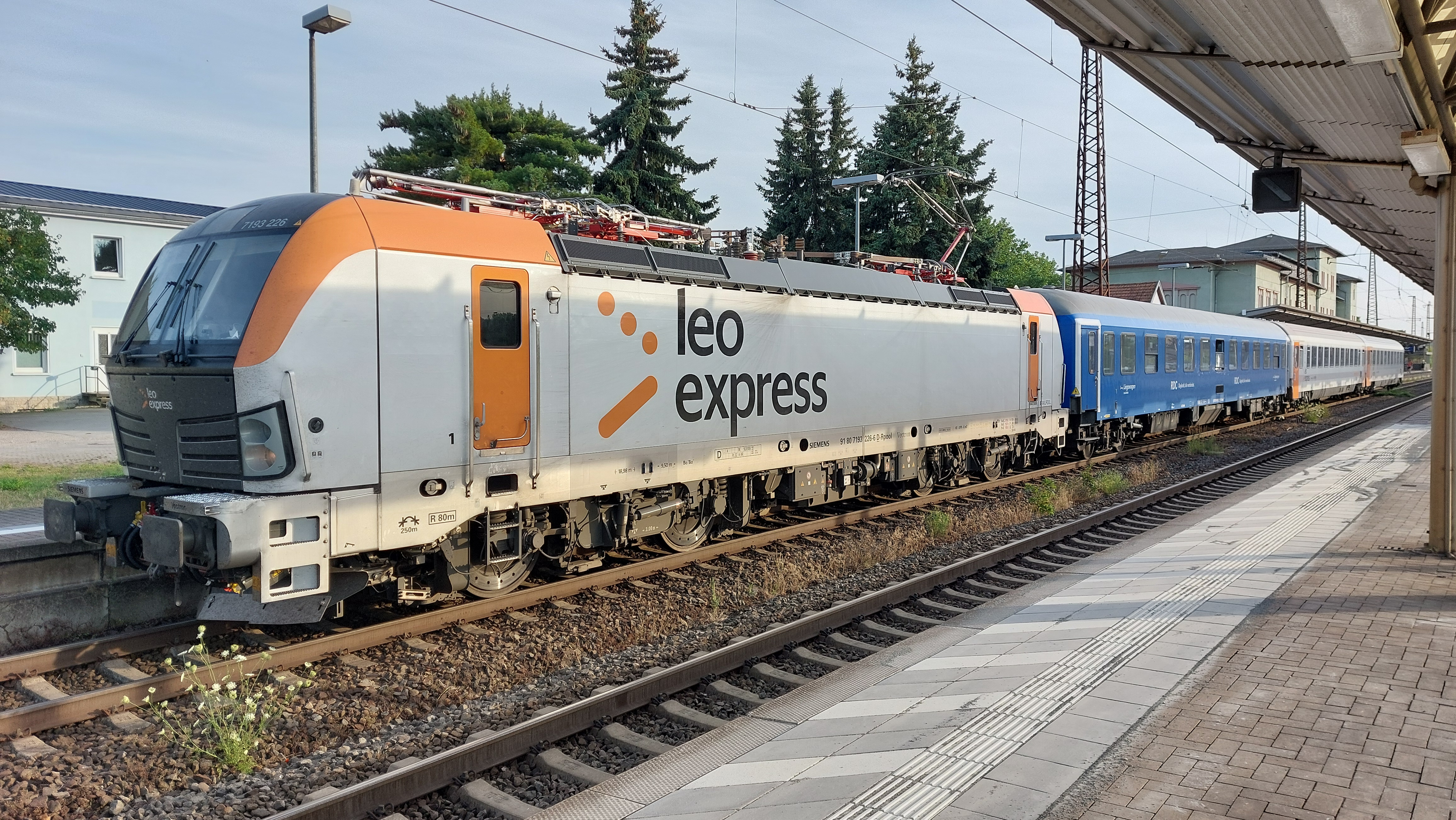
- Leo Express train 235 in Naumburg

Overview
- First service: 25 June 2026
- Current operator: Leo Express

Route
- Termini: Frankfurt Airport ≠ Przemyśl Główny
- Stops: Frankfurt South; Offenbach Hbf; Hanau Hbf; Fulda; Eisenach; Gotha; Erfurt Hbf; Weimar; Apolda; Naumburg; Weißenfels; Leipzig Hbf ^{[tunnel]}; Dresden-Neustadt ↓; Dresden Hbf; Bad Schandau; Děčín hl.n.; Ústí nad Labem hl.n.; Kralupy nad Vltavou; Prague-Holešovice; Prague hl.n.; Prague-Vršovice; Pardubice hl.n.; Ústí nad Orlicí; Zábřeh na Moravě; Olomouc; Hranice na Moravě ↓; Suchdol nad Odrou ↓; Studénka ↓; Ostrava-Svinov; Ostrava hl.n.; Bohumín; Oświęcim; Kraków Główny ↓; Kraków Płaszów; Bochnia; Brzesko Okocim; Tarnów; Dębica; Sędziszów Małopolski; Rzeszów Główny; Łańcut; Przeworsk; Jarosław; Radymno; Przemyśl Zasanie
- Distance travelled: 1,471 km (914 mi)
- Service frequency: nightly
- Train numbers: 232 (westbound); 235 (eastbound)

On-board services
- Seating arrangements: IC1 carriages

Leo Express (train 232/235) was an overnight train service running through Germany, Czechia and Poland from June 2026 until October 2026. As of October 2026 the service was paused.

The nightly service starts at Frankfurt Airport long-distance station or Frankfurt (Main) Süd station, running via Leipzig Hauptbahnhof and Dresden Hauptbahnhof in Germany, then Děčín hlavní nádraží and Praha hlavní nádraží in Czechia to Bohumín railway station, continuing via Kraków Główny railway station to Przemyśl Główny railway station— near the Ukrainian border.

== Background ==
In December 2025, Leo Express announced that the service would begin from 25 June 2026.

As of July 2026 tickets were available from Frankfurt to Prague starting at 10 Euros. A small refreshment offer consisting of packed snacks and drinks brought to your seat is available on board. Leo Express were planning to sell Business Class and Couchette (sleeping) spaces from a later date.

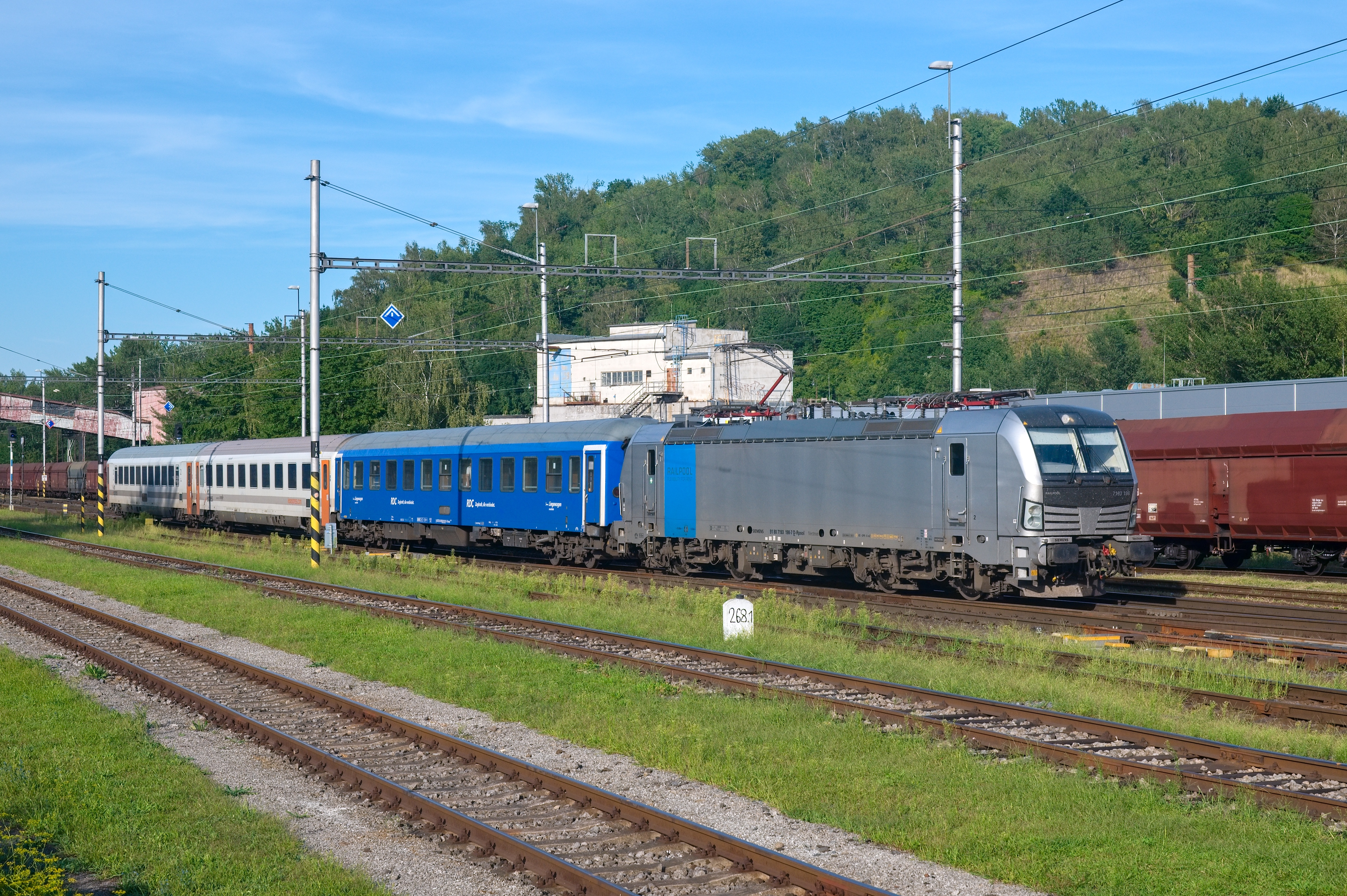
Train 232 in Ostrava hlavní nádraží

=== Germany ===
In Leipzig, the train stopped in the Leipzig Hauptbahnhof tunnel station, without changing direction.

On most days the trains were retimetabled to skip the final stop at Frankfurt Airport, instead starting and ending at Frankfurt South. On one occasion during reconstruction of the Kinzig Valley Railway the train ended/started at Fulda.

=== Poland ===
The train was planned to serve stops inside Poland up to the Ukrainian border at Przemyśl. With a completed length covering 1,300 kilometres (810 miles) the service would be one of the longest in Europe.

Until the end of July 2026, the eastern section after Bohumin via Kraków Główny railway station to Przemyśl Główny railway station—at the Ukrainian border—was stated to be replaced with a connecting bus. The connecting bus only ran on selected days, totaling 3‒4 times within of July 2026.

From June‒July 2026, the Leo Express service had started and ended at Bohumín, following application of a European Union-test for Economic equilibrium by PKP Intercity of Poland.

During the fourth Polish timetable planning cycle in September 2026, the service was rescheduled to run five nights per week between Bohumin‒Frankfurt, with three of those nights running the full Przemyśl‒Bohumin‒Frankfurt route.

=== October 2026 ===
At the beginning of October 2026, a pause of service was announced based on construction work in Germany: with the final service being on 5/6 October 2026, departing from Frankfurt towards Bohumin.
