= Ludwig-Schunk-Stiftung =

German foundation

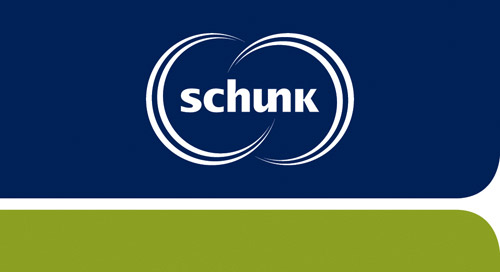
- Schunk Group logo
- Founded: 1947
- Founder: Ludwig Schunk
- Type: Private Foundation
- Location: Heuchelheim, near Giessen

The Ludwig-Schunk-Stiftung (Ludwig Schunk Foundation) is a private foundation in the Central Hesse town of Heuchelheim, operated as a registered association. Its founding resulted from the last will and testament of the entrepreneur and company founder Ludwig Schunk (1884–1947). The Foundation holds one hundred percent of the registered capital of the Schunk Group.

== Objectives ==
The Foundation has on the one hand trusteeship tasks in connection with execution of Schunk's testament while on the other hand being the owner of capital and, with the support of Schunk GmbH, manager of the corporate group.

The trusteeship tasks are mandated by the testament. By virtue of its preamble and corporate charter objective the Ludwig-Schunk-Stiftung is also formally bound by the corresponding requirements of the testament. This also includes promotion of and support to scientific and social institutions. For promotion of future generations of scientists, in conjunction with the firm of Pfeiffer Vakuum of Asslar, the Röntgen Prize for Sciences is awarded.

The Ludwig-Schunk-Stiftung performs the functions of owner and capital holder in accordance with statutory regulations and the corporate charter. According to the intention of Ludwig Schunk, the Foundation must manage the assets left to it and ensure the continued existence of Schunk companies. The testator's mandate to ensure continued existence has, in that context, absolute priority. Employee sharing in the profits is only possible with sustained success of the operating companies ensured over the long term. This was a prioritized concern for Ludwig Schunk, as becomes clear from his testament.

The resources needed for meeting the objectives are exclusively earned from the profits of the operating companies. For that reason, the operating companies must, within the framework of their possibilities, do everything they can to earn and secure appropriate returns. This also includes fashioning cost and organizational structures in a competitive manner.

At the same time, the employees are supposed to share in the profits. This was a central concern for Ludwig Schunk. According to the spirit and the wording of his testament, however, profits may only be distributed to employees if adequate resources are available to secure the company's future.

With all of his social commitment, Ludwig Schunk's focus was always on ensuring the future of the company.

The Foundation must attend to its objectives independently. Its only obligations are to statutory regulations, the requirements of the testament and the corporate charter. In its function as capital holder and trustee it controls the work of the operating companies. In doing so it is supported by the management company, Schunk GmbH, whose supervisory board has an equal number of management and employee members.

== Governance bodies ==
The society's governance bodies are the membership meeting and the board of directors. The society consists of twelve members, at least half of which are employees of Schunk companies.

By means of the design of the Foundation, Ludwig Schunk prepared the way as best he could for the future of his life's work beyond his death.

== Sources ==
- Die Ludwig-Schunk Stiftung stellt sich vor, in-house information booklet, no date.
