= Ludwig Schunk =

German industrialist

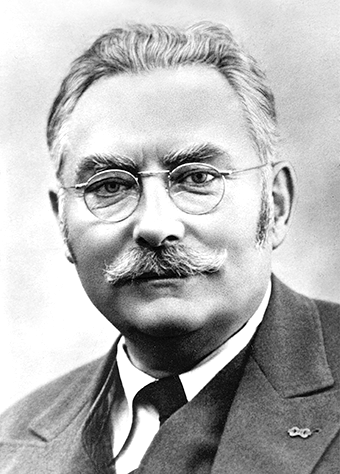
- Born: May 1, 1884; Frankfurt, Germany
- Died: May 10, 1947 (aged 63); Heuchelheim, near Giessen
- Engineering career
- Projects: Schunk Group, Ludwig-Schunk-Stiftung

Ludwig Schunk (May 1, 1884 – May 10, 1947) was a German manufacturer and cofounder of the firm of Schunk und Ebe oHG.

Schunk und Ebe oHG was founded in 1913 as a factory for production of carbon brushes for dynamos and electric motors in Fulda in Hesse and moved in 1918 to Heuchelheim near Giessen. The company developed into being the Schunk Group, a technology concern with worldwide operations.

== Early life ==
Ludwig Schunk's forebears had been settled in the Central Hesse region since the middle of the 18th century and for several generations had been nail makers in Büdingen. His grandfather had still exercised that craft. Ludwig Schunk's father, as the youngest of three children, saw practically no possibility of ever being able to take over his father's workshop and moved to Frankfurt where, among other things, he worked in a graphic art firm. Ludwig Schunk grew up as the younger of two children in what were modest circumstances. Nonetheless, his family made it possible for him to attend an eight-year secondary school which he successfully completed.

From 1898 to 1901 Ludwig Schunk was an apprentice in an import firm in the leather machinery trade with offices in Frankfurt and in Boston, US. There, the young man very early on became aware of the important significance of worldwide business operations for the success of an enterprise.

== Career ==
Subsequent to his training and up until April 1, 1903, Schunk was employed by the firm where he had been an apprentice. Schunk gathered further professional experience as an office clerk in the purchasing department of an aniline and aniline dye factory in Offenbach. His modest family circumstances had very early on led Schunk to the conviction that only above-average hard work and constant pursuit of education could make the prerequisites for social advancement possible. Following this motto, he in 1905 decided to go to France in order to develop his language skills and his "world skills." Schunk was in command of the two world languages, English and French, and was able to find employment as manager of foreign correspondence in an important company in the electric industry in Paris. There followed a six-year stay in Paris, Ludwig Schunk became familiar with the manufacture of carbon brushes for electrical machinery. The bright prospects for the future of that field prompted him, after his return to Germany, to strike off on his own.

=== Schunk & Ebe oHG ===
In 1913, 29 years old, he and the mechanic and machine fitter Karl Ebe, who had also gathered experience in the carbon industry, founded the carbon brush factory of Schunk & Ebe oHG in Fulda. Karl Ebe died only a year after the company started up.

In 1918 Ludwig Schunk moved the company, operated in rented premises, from Fulda to Heuchelheim near Giessen where he was able to buy the former tourist restaurant "Windhof" which had sufficient space to set up production equipment. As far back as in those early days, the first representation offices were founded in various large German cities and export business was set up. In the next few years, this new company acquired a sound reputation with customers and competitors.

He endeavored to expand and shore up his company through diversification into related fields of technology. To that end, he in 1923 acquired a carbon brush holder factory and integrated it into his operations in Heuchelheim. In 1932 the production of sintered bearings was started. The carbon orientation had already previously been expanded with products for mechanical applications. The increasingly difficult economic environment could not prevent Ludwig Schunk's life work from advancing. As the Reichsmark lost ever more of its value and the concomitant heavy inflation increased as well, Schunk successfully sought new sales markets abroad from which stable currency flowed in. By boosting his export business he succeeded in avoiding losses of real assets for his company.

In accordance with his social orientation, Ludwig Schunk, in 1940, took the initiative to found a providential fund whose charter-based objectives were to provide voluntary one-time or ongoing support to employees, former employees or their relatives in case of neediness, disability or old age. The providential fund could grant retirement pensions, widow's or orphan's pensions or death grants.

== Personal life and legacy ==
Ludwig Schunk did not have any children. His wife, who had collaborated very energetically in building up the company, had died early. The heirs of his deceased partner had been compensated so that he was sole owner of the corporate assets. As early as 1938 he decided in his will that those assets would be made available to the employees. He clarified this in a supplemental testament in 1942 and made the providential fund he had founded his sole heir. According to his own words, the example he was following was that of the Zeiss Foundation in Jena.

Leading up to and during World War II, Ludwig Schunk held various public offices. Among other things, Schunk after December 1936 directed the "Coal and Brushes Specialist Team," one of 24 sections of the electrical industry business group. After 1945, Schunk was banned from his company grounds by the American military authorities and the company was put under the control of trustees. However, in the proceedings subsequently instigated Schunk was rehabilitated.

All of Ludwig Schunk's strivings had been focused on advancing and developing his life's work, the company of Schunk & Ebe that he had created together with his partner Karl Ebe from modest beginnings with his employees and for the welfare of the latter.

In 1947, after having had health problems ever since his youth, Ludwig Schunk died at the age of 63 from heart failure. As he had arranged, the providential fund became upon his death heir to the assets of the firm of Schunk & Ebe.

After the death of Ludwig Schunk, the firm of Schunk & Ebe GmbH was founded, whose capital shares were now held by the providential fund. Now, as holder of the capital, it was named the “Ludwig-Schunk-Gedächnisverein” (registered association) and has since 1989 been known as the Ludwig-Schunk Stiftung.
