= Schunk Group =

German technology company

SCHUNK GROUP
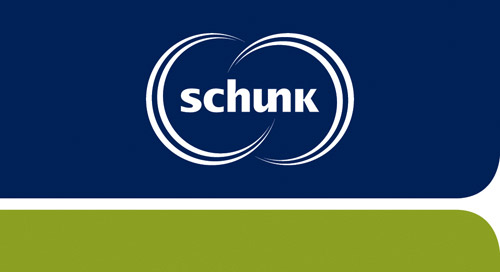
- Industry: Technology
- Founded: 1913
- Headquarters: Heuchelheim, Germany
- Key people: Peter R. Manolopoulos (CEO); Dr. Ulrich von Huelsen (COO); Dr. Petra Schmidt (COO)
- Products: Components and systems for various industrial sectors
- Revenue: € 1,400 million (2022)
- Number of employees: more than 9,000 worldwide
- Website: www.schunk-group.com

The Schunk Group is a company headquartered in Germany. The most important fields of endeavor are carbon technology and ceramics, environmental simulation and climate technology, sintered metals as well as ultrasonic welding.

The Schunk Group has a presence in 29 countries with more than 60 operative companies. Consolidated sales came to EUR 1,450 million in 2022 and the number of employees is more than 9,000. The Schunk Group comprises four divisions and a total of 10 business units.

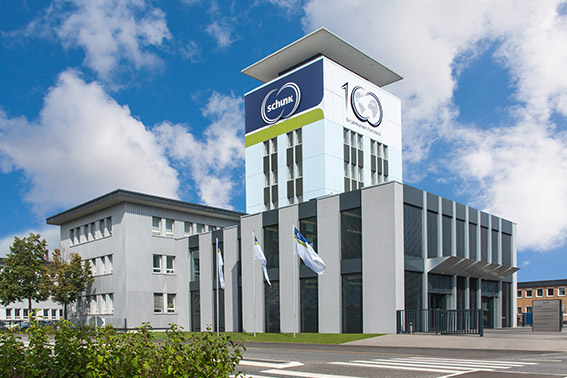
Reception building of the Schunk Group in Heuchelheim

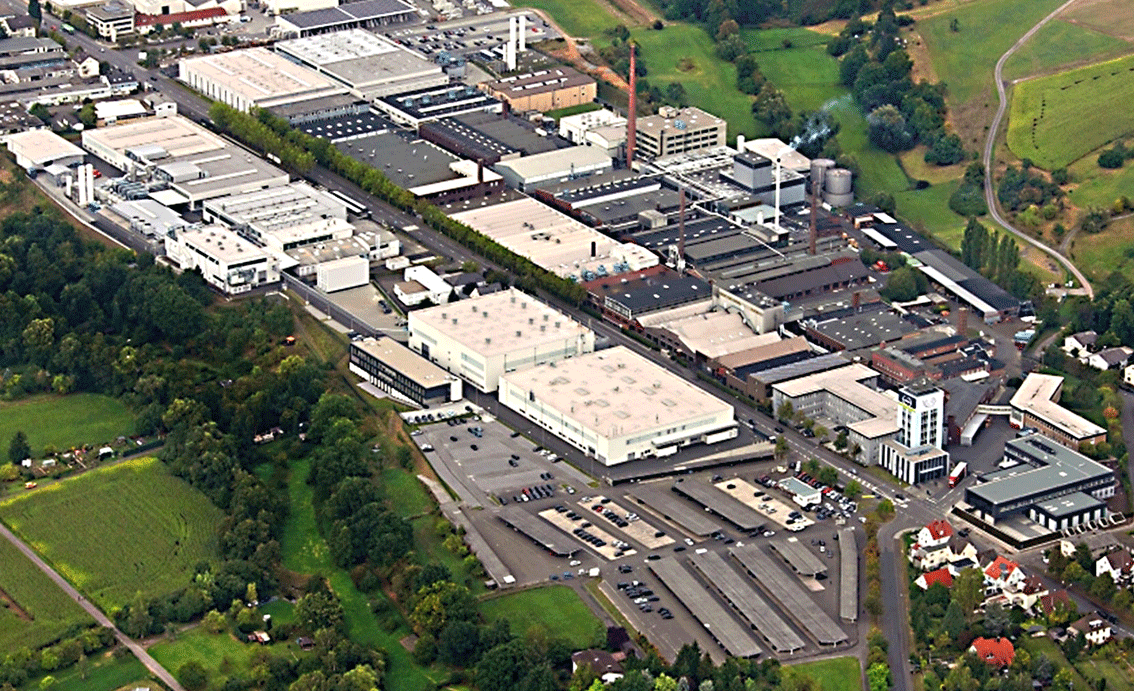
Schunk corporate headquarters in Heuchelheim

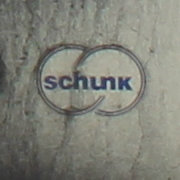
Company logo as of 1995 — styled "schտĸ".

== Historical ==
The company was founded by Ludwig Schunk and Karl Ebe in 1913 in Fulda to produce carbon brushes. In 1918 the company moved to Heuchelheim near Giessen. The childless founder Ludwig Schunk (1884–1947) bequeathed the company's entire assets to the Providential Fund for Company Members. That fund was meant to provide voluntary financial support to employees and former employees or their relatives in case of neediness, invalidity or old age. Today, the registered association Ludwig-Schunk Stiftung (Ludwig Schunk Foundation) performs, as trustee, the tasks set forth in the company founder's will.

== Structure of the company ==
The Schunk Group is divided up into four divisions:

=== Division Schunk Carbon Technology ===
The Schunk Carbon Technology Division manufactures construction components, among other things from carbon/graphite, carbon compounds, silicon carbide and quartz. It is broken down into the following business units:

- Tribology: Bearing and sealing rings as well as valves made of carbon and silicon carbide.
- High Temperature Applications: Graphite components for industrial furnaces, crucibles for silicon production, atom absorption spectrometry (AAS) cells, components of fiber-reinforced carbon (FRC), etc.
- Small Motor Technology: Carbon brushes and holder systems for electric motors in household appliances and power tools.
- Current Transmission: Carbon brushes and holder systems for large electric motors, pantographs and grounding contacts for railroads.
- Automotive: Carbon brushes, brush plates for starters, brush plates for fuel pumps.
- Technical Ceramics:Burners and burner nozzles for direct and indirect heating, kiln furniture, oxide ceramics, sliding rings and bearings for shaft seals and pump components vulnerable to abrasion and corrosion, ceramic inlays for bulletproof vests.
- Semiconductor: Components for wafer production such as susceptors, levitors, quartz chambers, etc.

=== Division Weiss Technik ===
The companies Weiss Umwelttechnik GmbH and Weiss Klimatechnik GmbH operate under the trademark of the Weiss Technik. Karl Weiss GmbH was founded in 1956 as a manufacturer of electrophysical equipment. In 1978 it was taken over by the Schunk Group. The Weiss Technik consists of the two business units, Environmental Simulation and Air Solutions. In the course of several decades the company consortium expanded both nationally and internationally. The Weiss Technik has a total of over 22 companies in 14 countries worldwide and employs about 2,000 people (with 850 in the main plant at Reiskirchen-Lindenstruth in Hesse).

Weiss Environmental Simulation develops and produces test equipment and systems for environmental simulation. The product program comprises testing systems for temperature and climate testing, weathering, temperature shock, corrosion and long-term testing in all test area sizes as well as major area systems and process integrated systems for environmental simulation and biology. The Air Solutions core business includes development and manufacture of complete ceiling systems for operating rooms, industrial clean room technology and air conditioning of computer rooms.

=== Division Schunk Sinter Metals ===
The Schunk Sinter Metals Division of the Schunk Group consists of the firms of Schunk Sintermetalltechnik GmbH Giessen, Schunk Sintermetalltechnik GmbH Thale and Sintermetalltechnik S.A. de C.V. Mexiko. Schunk Sinter Metals primarily produces sintered structural parts such as gearwheels, camshaft adjusters, locking cams, metal injection mold (MIM) parts as well as precision bearings. The main users are in the automotive and electric industries, or are producers of household and power tools and medical technology.

=== Division Schunk Sonosystems ===
Schunk Sonosystems GmbH came about by merging the firms of Schunk Ultraschalltechnik GmbH and STAPLA Ultraschalltechnik GmbH. The products of this division cover the entire spectrum of welding applications using ultrasonic welding. This likewise includes amalgamation of non-ferrous metals and thermoplastic synthetics. In the late 1970s Schunk developed ultrasonic metal welding to industrial marketability. It is now mainly used to weld cable trees in the automotive industry.

== History ==
Ludwig Schunk and Karl Ebe in 1913 founded the carbon brush factory Schunk+Ebe oHG in Fulda. In 1918 the company moved to Heuchelheim. In 1923 brush holders were included in the product line. Starting in 1924, there was manufacturing of electrographite and after 1928 the manufacture of metal contacts as well. In 1932 sinter metal production was started with sintering bearings. After the death of Ludwig Schunk in 1947, the estate of the founder, who had not had any children, passed to the "Providential Fund" of Schunk+Ebe oHG. In 1948 and 1949 a construction program was set up to expand the operation from 500 to 1200 employees. There followed in 1956 the incorporation of Schunk & Ebe S.A. in Brussels, the first foreign subsidiary. At present, Schunk is represented in Europe with 46 operating companies. In 1957 Schunk Electro Carbón S.A. de C.V. was incorporated in Mexico, becoming the first company on the American continent. In 1969 there followed the founding of the Brazilian company Schunk do Brasil Ltda. in São Paulo.

In 1978 what was then Karl Weiss GmbH was taken over. In the same year, Schunk Graphite Technology LLC. was founded in Wisconsin. Schunk's presence in the United States was reinforced in the 1980s and 1990s. Currently, Schunk is present in the US with eight operating companies. In 1993 the product spectrum was broadened with the division of ultrasonic welding technology. In 1986 a training program to train future generations of skilled workers in theory and practice was set up.

In 1991 the company experienced a crisis due to diversifications that failed, particularly in the field of automation technology. In the following year, 1992, there was restructuring, with the sale of automation technology.

In 1997 the acquisition of EHW Thale (sinter metal technology and enamel technology) and the incorporation of Pichit Industrial Works Co Ltd. in Pichit in Thailand followed. Today, Schunk has a presence in Asia with 15 companies. In 1999, Schunk (Aust) Pty. Ltd. was founded in Rowville, Australia.

In 2004 the Federal President, in connection with his first official trip through Germany, visited the plant. In 2005, the company was awarded the prize of "Hesse Champion" by the prime minister of Hesse, Roland Koch. In 2006 the Schunk Group joined the Make Things initiative of the Verein Deutscher Ingenieure (VDI) (Association of German Engineers). In 2007, the internet portal created by Schunk in the framework of that initiative, www.ingenieurparadies.com (Engineers Paradise), commenced operation.

In 2007 EHW Thale Email GmbH was sold to a group of three private investors. In 2008 Schunk received the VDI's Best Practice Award in the Promoting initiative category for its Engineers Paradise internet portal. The Ministry of the Environment of Baden-Württemberg once again awarded a prize to Schunk for its innovative manufacturing design of a fuel cell stack.

In 2010 Schunk completed the largest expansion in its almost 100 years of corporate history. Over the course of four years permanent investments were made in the division of high temperature applications. Thanks to this expansion of its capacity at the Heuchelheim site, Schunk today produces the largest carbon fiber plates for the semiconductor and solar industries worldwide.

In 2012 Schunk received the state of Hesse's innovation and growth award “Hesse Champion 2012” in the global market leader category for its automotive carbon brushes.

2013 Schunk celebrates its 100th jubilee.

2015 For the first time ever, Schunk Group generated a global turnover of more than one billion euros in 2015.

In 2016, Schunk Group acquired manufacturers for ultrasonic welding machines Ultrasonics Steckmann.

In 2018, Proterra and Schunk Carbon Technology worked together to standardize its charging and communication systems for power-agnostic vehicles.

== Literature ==
- Jens Kauer: Die Firma Schunk & Ebe. Geschichte eines mittelhessischen Unternehmens der Elektrotechnik 1913–1947. Gießen 1993
- Paul G. Kirsch (Hrsg.): Ein Unternehmen gehört sich selbst. Auf den Spuren der Zeiss’schen Stiftung. Kapitel 25: Schunk & Ebe GmbH. München 1967
