= Westbahn (company) =

Private Austrian railway company

Westbahn Management Gmbh

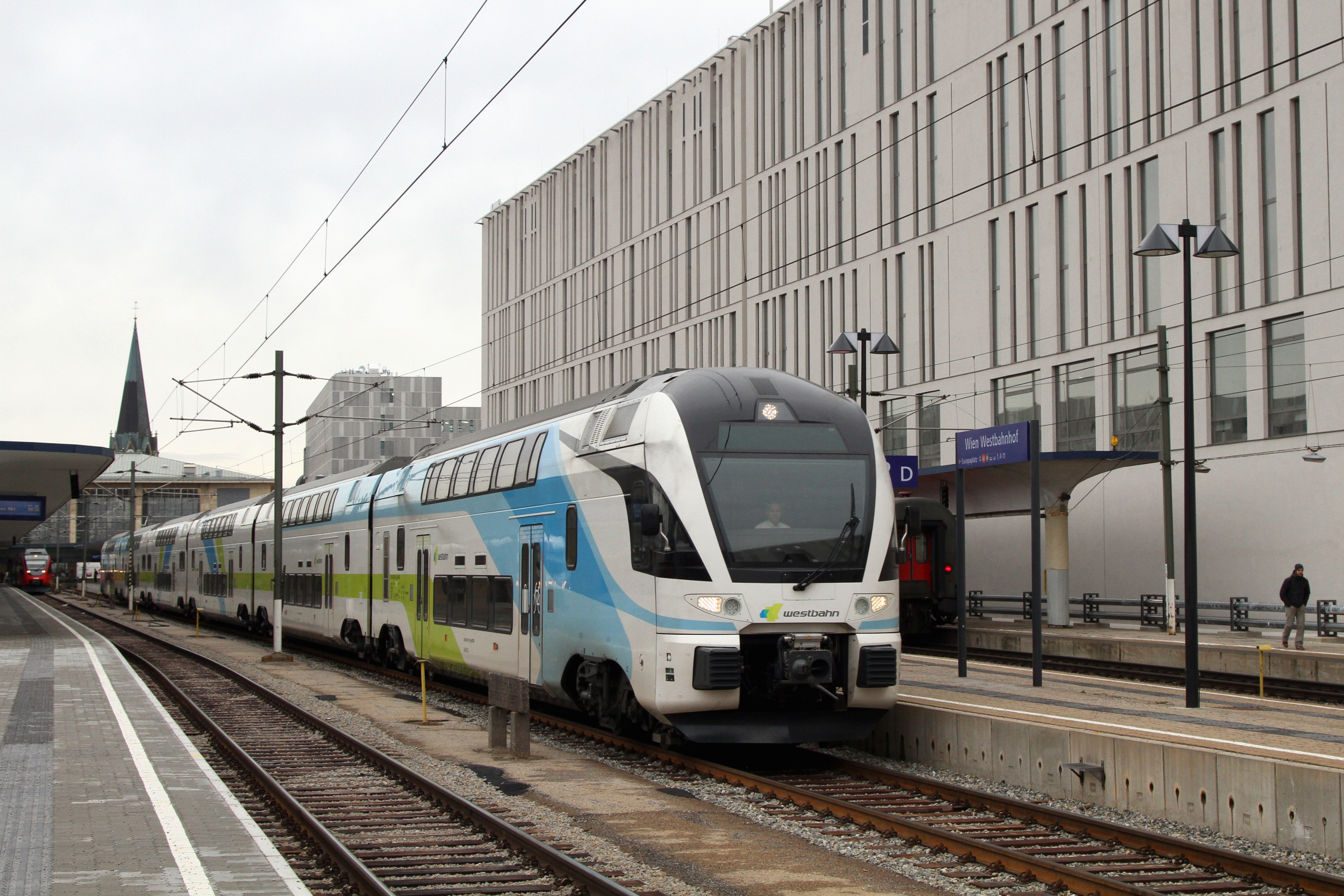

Overview
- Franchise: Open Access operator
- Main regions: Salzburg, Upper Austria, Lower Austria, Vienna
- Other regions: Tyrol, Vorarlberg, Bavaria, Baden-Württemberg
- Fleet: 15 Stadler KISS; 4 CRRC DDEMU2; 3 Stadler SMILE
- Stations called at: 36
- Parent company: RAIL Holding AG
- Dates of operation: 11 December 2011–

Technical
- Length: 1,099 kilometres (683 mi)

Other
- Website: westbahn.at

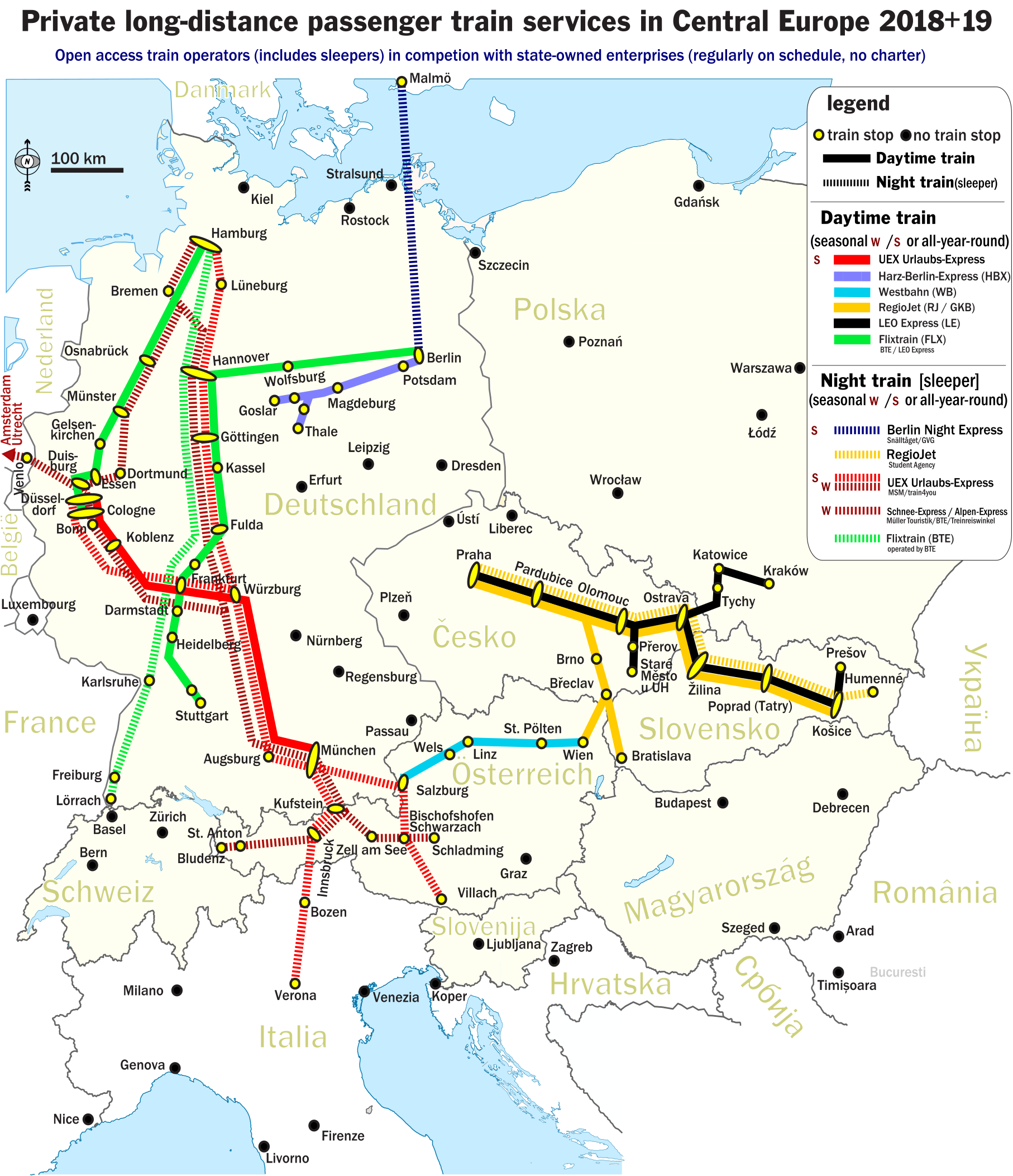
Connection map. Westbahn service shown in bright blue.

Westbahn Management GmbH (a subsidiary of RAIL Holding AG) is an open access railway company operating express train services on Austria's Western Railway (also known as Westbahn) since 11 December 2011. The French railway company SNCF has a 17.4 percent stake in Westbahn.

The associated company WESTbus became a part of the Flixbus network.

== Services ==
On 11 December 2011, Westbahn formally commenced operations on the Vienna–Salzburg route, becoming the first open-access operator to enter Austria's domestic long-distance railway market. It is operated in direct competition with the government-owned ÖBB, which promptly started offering heavily-discount fares on the same route. In response, Westbahn also introduced its own discounts on weekend fares; while a healthy level of ridership was reported by July 2012, revenue levels were stated to be below the levels that had been anticipated.

Westbahn initially operated a single service between Vienna and Salzburg over a distance of 308 kilometres (191 mi). Typically running in one-hour intervals, this service called at Wien Westbahnhof, Wien Hütteldorf, St. Pölten Hbf, Amstetten, Linz Hbf, Wels Hbf, Attnang-Puchheim and Salzburg Hbf. From its start of operation until September 2013, the service had also continued to Salzburg Taxham Europark and Freilassing due to the rebuilding of Salzburg Hbf.

During the 2010s, Westbahn often spoke out on legislative bias towards state-owned operators and the need for reform to favour the travelling public and competitive forces. In November 2012, the European Court of Justice (ECJ) found that the Austrian infrastructure manager ÖBB Infrastructure had acted unlawfully in preventing Westbahn's access of real-time data on train movements of other operators, hindering its operations. During November 2019, Austria's Federal Administrative Court ruled in favour of a complaint made by Westbahn as to how track access charges were being calculated and approved by the Austrian rail regular Schienen-Control; as a consequence, the charges for track access between 2011 and 2017 were recalculated to lower values. That same year, the ECJ also ruled in favour of Westbahn against the inclusion of station access charges in the area access packages that the company was purchasing.

In August 2019, it was announced that Westbahn would take on the open-access operations on the Vienna - Brno - Prague route from incumbent operator RegioJet on 15 December of that year.

During November 2020, it was announced that the Austrian government had temporarily reintroduced subsidies on the Vienna - Salzberg route for multiple operators, including Westbahn; this measures was taken largely in response to the economic consequences of the COVID-19 pandemic. Westbahn observed that this measure prevented further redundancies from becoming necessary amid the short term downturn in passenger travel during multiple national lockdowns. For this period, tickets were mutually accepted by both ÖBB and Westbahn. During February 2021, the company publicly appealed for subsidies to continue, stating that it would otherwise be compelled to half the frequency of its services; a two month extension of the subsidies for both Westbahn and ÖBB was agreed shortly thereafter.

On 8 April 2022, Westbahn expanded its service westwards into neighbouring Germany, initially operating four daily trains that served Munich East station and München Hauptbahnhof beyond Salzburg. This expansion had originally been announced in November 2018. In December 2022, Westbahn expanded three of its services from Salzburg to Innsbruck, which also serve both Kufstein and Wörgl.

In December 2023, Westbahn extends one Wien-Innsbruck return trip further west to Bregenz.

December 2024 sees the extension of two Wien-Munich trips west to Stuttgart, and the extension of a Wien-Innsbruck return trip to Lindau-Insel via Bregenz.

In March 2025, Westbahn announces the start of a new line between Wien Hauptbahnhof and Villach via Graz in March 2026, along with the introduction of new Stadler SMILE trainsets.

The current network, timetable and travel updates are published on the official website.

== Trains ==
By 2013, the company's fleet consists of seven Stadler KISS bilevel trains, each with six coaches, a total length of 150 metres, a top-speed of 200 km/h, acceleration of 0.85 m/s² and a capacity of 501 leather seats. The passengers are able to use WLAN for free on the trains. Every coach is serviced by an attendant, while 85 percent of Westbahn's 200 employees are on-board staff. Each train is provisioned with a dining car outfitted with eight seats and vending machines that dispense both cold and warm beverages. Snacks are available for purchase as well. One of the coaches is permanently reserved for premium passengers and is branded WESTbahn Plus.

On 11 May 2015, WESTbahn announced it had plans to place a €180m order for ten additional Stadler KISS double-deck electric multiple-units, comprising nine four-car sets and a single six-car set. Competition for this order included the Chinese rolling stock manufacturer CRRC Zhuzhou. During October 2019, the company placed an €300m order with Stadler for 15 six-car KISS EMUs that would replace its existing fleet of 17 double-deck KISS sets, which Westbahn sold to Deutsche Bahn. These new EMUs are configured with a new class - Comfort Class 2+ - as well as being lighter and more efficient than most contemporary rolling stock, it is also equipped with ETCS Level 2 Baseline 3. During September 2021, the first of these new-built KISS sets entered service on the Vienna - Salzburg route; all examples were in service by the end of the year. Their arrival facilitated the launch of new services.

In June 2021, Westbahn confirmed that it was working with CRRC Zhuzhou to develop additional rolling stock that it planned to lease to supplement its KISS fleet. The CRRC DDEMU2 or Class 4100 will constitute six-car units, comprising two motor and four trailer cars, possess a maximum speed of 200km/h, and be capable of operating under both 15kV and 25kV AC overhead electrification. Each six-car unit will have 571 seats grouped into two classes, and be equipped with vending machines, wheelchair and bicycle storage areas, and onboard WiFi. Many subsystems and components are drawn from European supplies as to ease operator logistics. The EMUs have been designed so that they can be used in multiple countries. In July 2022, the first of Westbahn's CRRC-built Class 4100 arrived at the Velim railway test circuit in the Czech Republic to undergo vehicle acceptance training; while the train was designed and manufactured in China, it is required to fully conform with European Union standards, including the relevant Technical Specifications for Interoperability.

== RAIL Holding AG ==
On 5 June 2012, CEO Stefan Wehinger, a former ÖBB director, resigned on diverging views about the company's strategy and sold his stake in Westbahn. Erich Forster, the company's former sales manager, took on the role of CEO thereafter. The board of directors includes Benedikt Weibel (Chairman), Hans Peter Haselsteiner, Erhard F. Grossnigg and Frank Bernard.

In November 2018, the ownership of Westbahn was divided between the Haselsteiner Family-Private Foundation (49.9%), Augusta Holding (Switzerland) (32.7%) (Augusta is held by Haselsteiner, Wehinger and company Oldro AG), and SNCF (France) (17.4%). In November 2019, SNCF announced that it was increasing its stake in the company from 17.4 percent to 25.3 percent, pending regulatory approval. As of 31 December 2024, SNCF still holds a 17% stake in the company.

== See also ==
- Rail transport in Austria
- Rail transport in Germany
