= Heuchelheim an der Lahn =

- Municipality
- Coat of arms

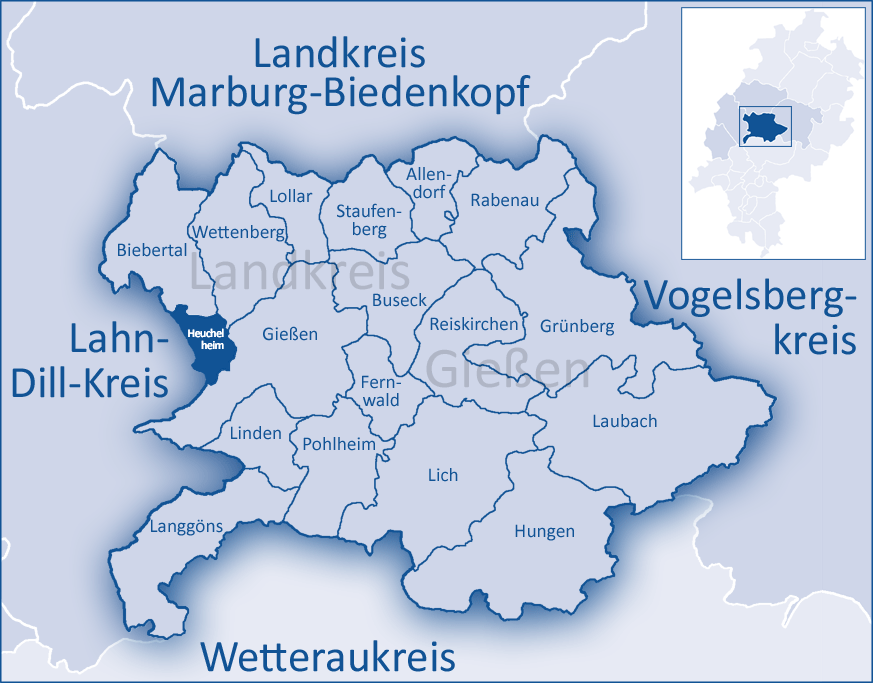
- Location of Heuchelheim an der Lahn within Gießen district
- Interactive map of Heuchelheim an der Lahn
- Location within Germany Location within Hesse
- Coordinates: 50°35′N 08°38′E
- Country: Germany
- State: Hesse
- Admin. region: Gießen
- District: Gießen
- Subdivisions: 2 Ortsteile

Government
  - Mayor (2021–27): Lars Burkhard Steinz (CDU)

Area
  - Total: 10.58 km^{2} (4.08 sq mi)
- Elevation: 153–276 m (502–906 ft)

Population (2025-12-31)
  - Total: 7,811
  - Density: 738.3/km^{2} (1,912/sq mi)
- Time zone: UTC+01:00 (CET)
  - Summer (DST): UTC+02:00 (CEST)
- Postal codes: 35452
- Dialling codes: 0641
- Vehicle registration: GI
- Website: www.heuchelheim.de

Heuchelheim an der Lahn (German pronunciation: [ˈhɔʏçl̩haɪm ʔan deːɐ̯ ˈlaːn], lit. 'Heuchelheim on the Lahn'; official name: Heuchelheim a. d. Lahn; before 2019: Heuchelheim) is a municipality in the district of Gießen, in Hesse, Germany. Since 1 April 1967 it has included the district Kinzenbach. It has approximately 8,000 residents spread across two districts - Heuchelheim (5,800 inhabitants) and Kinzenbach (2,200 inhabitants).

Until 1967 the independent villages of Heucheleim and Kinzenbach were part of other counties. In the 60s both villages cooperated leading to union in 1967. From 1977 to 1979 Heuchelheim formed part of the administrative town Lahn, a compound of Gießen, Wetzlar and other municipalities in between.
