= RegioJet =

Czech rail and bus company

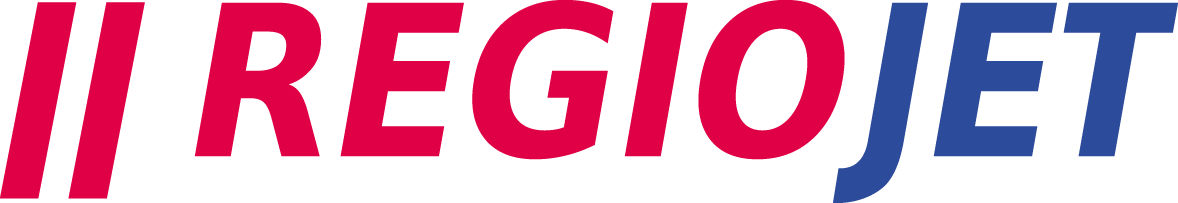
- Type: Private
- Industry: Transport
- Founded: 2009; 17 years ago
- Founder: Radim Jančura
- Headquarters: Brno, Czech Republic
- Area served: Europe
- Key people: Radim Jančura (CEO); Jiří Schmidt (strategy director)
- Services: Passenger rail transport; Intercity bus transport
- Revenue: CZK 3.22 billion (2023)
- Operating income: CZK 770.8 million (2023)
- Net income: CZK 336.5 million (2023)
- Total assets: CZK 6.31 billion (2023)
- Total equity: CZK 981.2 million (2023)
- Owner: Radim Jančura
- Number of employees: 1,498 (2023)
- Website: www.regiojet.com

RegioJet is a Czech private transport group headquartered in Brno, Czech Republic, operating passenger rail and bus services in Central Europe and across the EU.

Founded in 2009 by entrepreneur Radim Jančura, the company began operating commercial passenger rail services in the Czech Republic in 2011. It became one of the first private operators to compete with the state-owned České dráhy on major long-distance routes.

RegioJet operates passenger rail services in the Czech Republic, Slovakia, Austria and Poland, and provides domestic and international bus services.

== Corporate structure ==
The RegioJet group is headed by RegioJet holding a.s., which is wholly owned by its founder Radim Jančura. Passenger rail services in the Czech Republic are operated by RegioJet a.s., while RegioJet Pool a.s. manages and maintains rolling stock and leases locomotives to other operators. RegioJet ÚK a.s. operates regional rail services in the Ústí nad Labem Region, and Student Agency k.s. operates domestic and international bus services under the RegioJet brand.

The group also has subsidiaries in Slovakia, Austria, Germany and Poland.

== History ==
RegioJet was founded in 2009 by a Czech entrepreneur Radim Jančura as a new venture into passenger rail transport, before that Radim Jančura already had a successful business Student Agency that started out by mediating au-pair stays for students, eventually branching out into Bus transport, selling air tickets and selling whole holiday packages.

On 24 February 2006, Student Agency was recognised in the TTG Travel Awards of 2005 as "Best flight (IATA) agency in the Czech Republic" and "Best bus transporter". In the same year, CEO Radim Jančura expressed his intention to extend Student Agency's bus transport within 3 years and to also become a provider of rail.

The company RegioJet a.s. was incorporated in the Companies Register on 20 March 2009 with the subject of enterprise "production, business and services not stated in attachments 1 to 3 of the Trade Licensing Act" and on 6 October 2009 the subject of activity "operator of railway and railway transport" was registered. A sister company of the same name, RegioJet a.s., with its registered office in Bratislava was established in 2010 and is nowadays an operator of rail and bus transport in Slovakia.

Occasional public rail transport under the brand RegioJet was operated for the first time on 24 April 2010. The operation of the first railway line of regular passenger transport began on 26 September 2011.

In 2016, bus transport, still under the Student Agency brand, was incorporated under the RegioJet brand for the first time. The decision to include bus transport under the marketing brand RegioJet, which was originally used only for rail transport, originated especially because of the company's interest to unify all transport activities under one brand and also because of the lack of understanding especially for foreign clients – the history of Student Agency was not as well known abroad, so the name appeared to be incomprehensible and impractical for a transport company. The Slovak company RegioJet had started to operate bus transport under the brand RegioJet even earlier, since February 2015.

== Bus transport ==
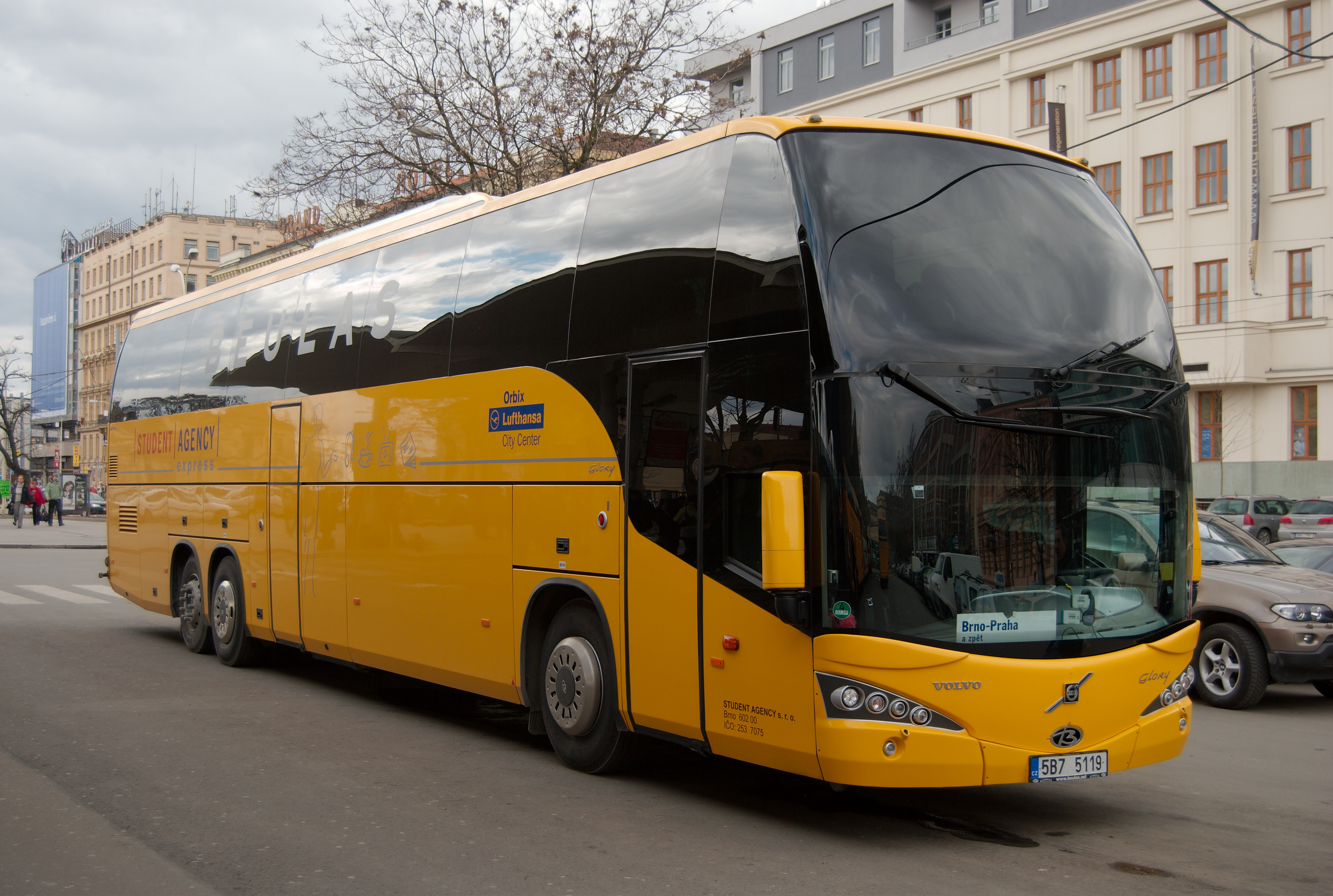
Student Agency Bus

SInce 1996, Student Agency operated international bus transport – the first line was from Prague to London, and in the following years buses operated to other European countries, including cities in Germany, Switzerland, Benelux, lines connecting the Czech Republic with cities in Sweden, Norway, Italy, Hungary, Austria and the Slovak Republic, and later in France and elsewhere.

Since 2004, the company Student Agency has operated on domestic lines in the Czech Republic. Within the Czech Republic, yellow buses started on the route Prague - Brno for the first time in January 2004, and other lines soon followed. The lines of these yellow buses connected Prague and Brno with 36 cities in the Czech Republic.

On 4 April 2016, the rebranding of bus transport was started in the Czech Republic, as the name Student Agency was considered to be incomprehensible outside of the Czech Republic.

=== Fleet ===
In the early stages, during the operator's time as Student Agency, bus transport was provided by vehicles of Spanish brand Ayats Atlantis on the MAN chassis. Afterwards, the company started to use Spanish Beulas buses on the Scania and Volvo chassis. In 2006, the company further invested into five Mercedes-Benz Travego buses, particularly for lines heading to Vienna.

In 2012, the fleet owned by the company amounted to approximately 110 buses, out of which 5 were of a white colour, as the company operated them on the routes between Prague – Nuremberg and Prague – Munich on behalf of Deutsche Bahn, with the other vehicles painted in a noticeable yellow colour.

In 2013, the size of the fleet had increased to 152 buses. The most common type was the Spanish Irizar PB on the Scania or Volvo chassis – the company owned 93 of the type, out of which 67 were equipped with Fun & Relax equipment.

In April 2016, 45 super modern Irizar i8 buses of the newest generation arrived as part of the company's fleet. The first of these buses were introduced on the route between Prague – Dresden – Berlin. The number of buses operating under the brand RegioJet grew to reach 210 as a result of the new vehicles.

In September 2023 RegioJet showed off new Setra S 531 DT double decker buses for international routes, they only have 58 seats, the upper deck has a 2+1 configuration which gives you more space all around you and is marketed as Relax class, while the lower deck has the more standard 2+2 layout with both forward and rear facing seats and is marketed as Standard Class, there is also a free self service coffee machine, a water tap for both still and sparkling water as well as a vending machine with snacks and drinks, a toilet is also located on the lower deck. All the airline style seats are also equipped with seatback displays. All seats also have at least a USB A and USB C power socket, some also have regular European schuko power sockets In 2026 the same buses with a new interior configuration for domestic lines entered service, they have most of the same amenities but the upper deck is no longer in a 2+1 layout, opting for the regular 2+2 layout albeit with still more room than usual. this new configuration can carry 72 passengers, 14 more than the version for international lines.

== Rail transport ==
In 2006, Student Agency began to consider operating rail transport. The intention was to start with trains on the Prague-Ostrava route which would compete with the EC/IC trains and SC Pendolino from state-owned operator České dráhy. In June 2007, owner Radim Jančura announced that a tender procedure for a producer was underway. The transport was meant to be cheaper and more luxurious than the Pendolino from České dráhy, with a design resembling the ICE 3 trains operating in Germany.

In March 2009, the subsidiary company RegioJet a.s. was incorporated. The first train started on 24 April 2010 within the advertising event Žluté jaro na železnici ("Yellow spring on the railway"). The price of a return ticket between any stations was a symbolic CZK 5. This advertising operation was described by a representative of the company as the following: "We want to show how modern vehicles can contribute to the simplification and improvement of transport service".

In the following years, the company participated in selection procedures, submitted offers for operating subsidised transport to various regions and the Ministry of Transport and negotiated with these regions.

=== Routes ===
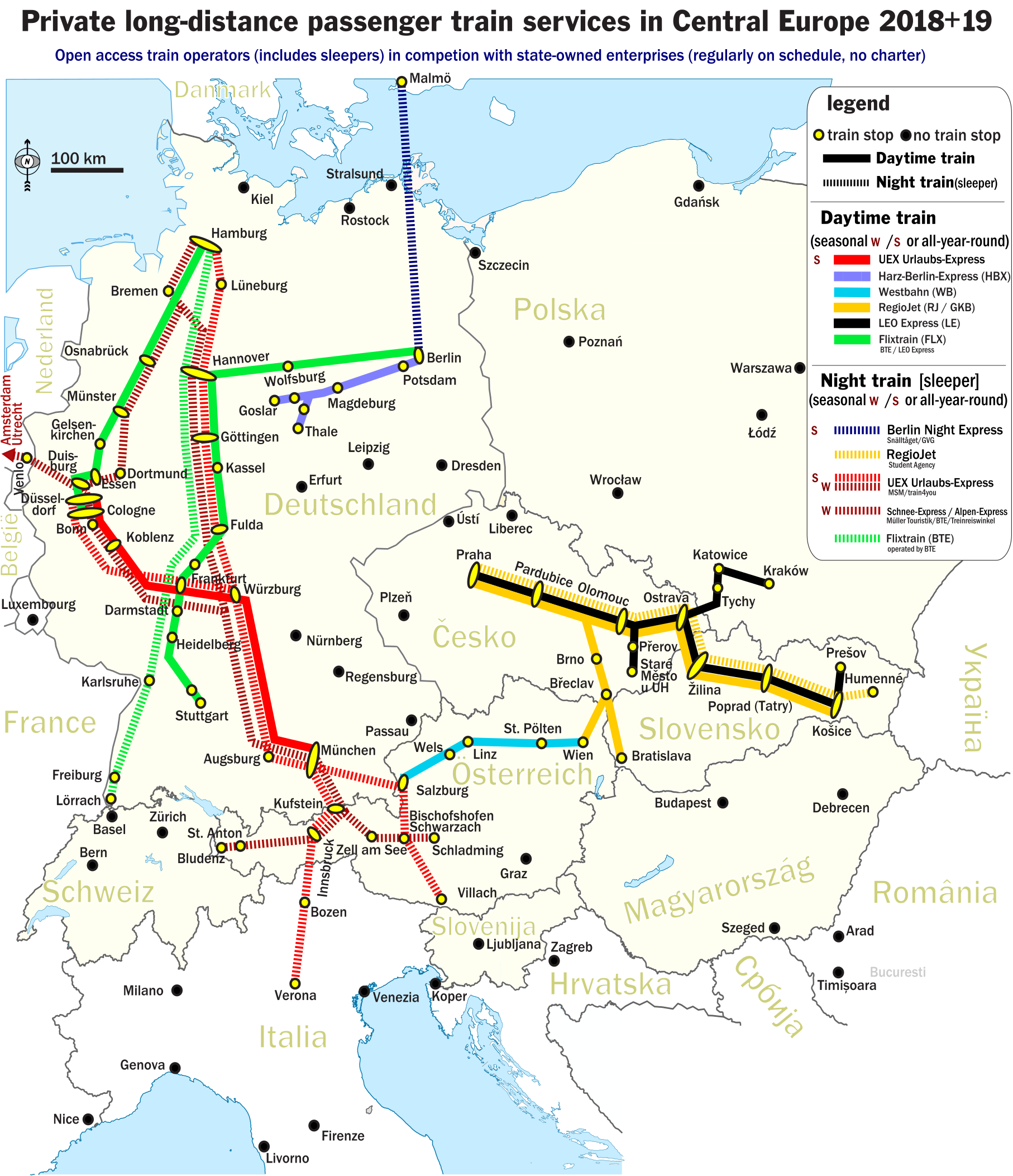
Map of privately operated long-distance trains in Central Europe. RegioJet services shown in yellow-gold.

==== Prague – Ostrava – Havířov – Žilina (SK) – Košice (SK) – Humenné (SK) Route ====
Since 26 September 2011, RegioJet has operated, at its own business risk, regular rail transport without an order from the Ministry of Transport, only receiving compensation for student and senior discounts from public funds. The beginning of the operation was accompanied by great media coverage.

The company started with three pairs of lines between Prague and Havířov, and in December 2011 the trains also began operating in a regular two-hour interval to other stations in the Ostrava Region (Český Těšín, Třinec) and one pair of lines started to make its way to Žilina.

On 29 September 2011, state-owned operator České dráhy reduced some fares within the campaign ČD Promo, especially the full fare on the routes between Prague–Ostrava, Prague–Brno and Prague – Hradec Králové. The new fare price between Prague and Ostrava was similar to the price set by RegioJet. RegioJet declared this step as unfair competition and a misuse of the dominant position of České dráhy on the market.

In December 2012, RegioJet announced a CZK 30 – 50 mil loss for 2012, which was justified according to the "predatory pricing" by České dráhy on the route between Prague-Ostrava. Train occupancy was approximately 80%. RegioJet blamed the pricing policy of České dráhy for its negative business results, and after raising a challenge before the Antitrust Authority, RegioJet decided to challenge České dráhy before the Court for this connection. The losses would be covered from other activities, as the whole Student Agency group showed gains of CZK 110 mil at earnings over CZK 1.6 billion.

In October 2014, the operator introduced services on the Prague-Košice route, and in December 2015 the operation was enlarged with sleeping cars added.

==== Bratislava (SK) – Dunajská Streda (SK) – Komárno (SK) Route ====
On 27 December 2010, RegioJet acquired a nine-year contract with the Ministry of Transport of the Slovak Republic to operate subsidised rail transport on the route between Bratislava – Dunajská Streda – Komárno, with service beginning on 4 March 2012. Before commencing transportation on this route, RegioJet reportedly invested approximately €60,000 into the modernisation of waiting shelters and other furniture at stations, as well as adding security cameras. From 2019 until 2023, this route has been returned to the national operator, ZSSK, who used Class 754s and ÖBB Class 2016s on this route. Since December 2023, another Czech private carrier Leo Express has been running regular trains on this line.

==== Prague – Brno – Bratislava (SK) Route ====
Since 11 December 2016, the company has launched trains on the Prague – Brno – Bratislava route. At present (since 2 September 2018), RegioJet trains run 4 times a day to Bratislava, and the other two lines on this route ensure transportation with the terminal in Brno.

==== Prague - Brno – Vienna (AT) ====
Since December 2017, the transporter has cooperated with Graz-Köflacher Bahn und Busbetrieb GmbH to operates four pairs of trains from Prague through Brno to Vienna. The trains terminate at Wien Hauptbahnhof with an intermediate stop at Wien Simmering.

==== R8 Line Brno - Přerov - Bohumín ====
Regiojet also operates domestic long distance (Rychlík) trains between south Moravian city Brno, Moravian-Silesian cities Ostrava and Bohumín. However, due to the monopoly Regiojet is having on this line the level of service tends to be lower in comparison to the others. Trains runs every hour in both directions, 17 times a day. Regiojet uses locomotives Siemens Vectron 193 or occasionally Bombardier Traxx 386 with 2x Low cost Bmpz (ex Swiss SBB Bpm), 2x 2 class Bmz + Bistro section (ex DB Bvcmbz^{249} couchettes) and 1x 1 class Amz (ex Swiss Am). The stops on the route are Brno Královo Pole - Brno hlavní nádraží (Brno main station) - Vyškov na Moravě (- Nezamyslice-only 2 trains -) - Kojetín - Přerov - Hranice na Moravě - Suchdol nad Odrou - Studénka - Ostrava Svinov - Ostrava hlavní nádraží (Ostrava main station) - Bohumín.

==== Praha - Bratislava - Budapest - Rijeka/Split ====
In 2021 RegioJet launched a new seasonal line from Prague to Rijeka and Split in Croatia, dividing in Ogulin. The line only operates in the summer. In Croatia the train is pulled by Hžpp/Hž locomotives, usually two Hž 1141 from the border to Rijeka and two Hž 2044 from Ogulin to Split.

==== Ústí nad Labem services ====
From December 2019, Regiojet will take over the 10 year tender for services U5, U7 and U13 in the Ústí nad Labem Region.

==== Poland domestic services (Warszawa – Kraków / Trójmiasto / Poznań) ====
At the turn of the year 2025/2026 company started services on domestic lines in Poland:

- 18 September 2025, Warszawa - Kraków route
- 14 December 2025, Kraków - Warszawa - Gdynia route
- 1 March 2026, Warszawa - Poznań route

===== Controversies =====
RegioJet repeatedly made statements, that timetable, infrastructure and operations management by infrastructure and station managers (PKP Polskie Linie Kolejowe, PKP SA) are hostile towards RegioJet, and the actions of PKP Intercity show signs of unfair competition. RegioJet says, that actions taken by state-owned, and PKP Intercity related companies caused refusal of access to advertisements areas on railway buildings, refusal of access to operate ticket offices, obstruction to the use of a train service siding, that was won by RegioJet's in a public tender. Radim Jančura, head and owner of Regiojet said, that "Poland is hell". Private communication between Radim Jancura and Janusz Malinowski, head of PKP Intercity, caused Prosecutor office and Office of Internal Safety (ABW) action.

3 days before the 2025/2026 timetable entered into force, RegioJet had announced, that most of newly planned trains on routes Warszawa-Kraków, Warszawa-Trójmiasto and the new Warszawa-Poznań route, would not be launched. Sudden cancellation caused chaos: passengers had bought tickets, which were refunded, regional trains had unnecessary stops with excessive stop times to allow non-existent RegioJet trains to overtake; the national railway network manager said, that the abrupt cancellation caused excessive work to implement the new annual timetable, and announced action to prevent such situations in future, Urząd Transportu Kolejowego (Poland's Railway Transport Office) announced extraordinary action and inspection.

At 7 April 2026, Prezes Urzędu Transportu Kolejowego (Poland's Railway Transport Office chairman) made decision, which confirmed that RegioJet "has performed unlawful practices, violating collective passenger's interests", and may start proceeding an administrative penalty.

===== Domestic services closure announcement in Poland =====
At 12 April 2026, RegioJet announced closure of all Poland domestic services since 4 May 2026, caused by hostile predatory ticket price management and infrastructure restrictions, however, independent experts comment that real cause, putting aside debatable unfair competition, is inappropriate set-up for market entry, improvisation and "hurry-scurry" actions.

At 20 April 2026, sanepid (Sanitary and Epidemiological Station) in Krakow closed an unreported food warehouse operated by RegioJet, and demanded food disposal. During inspection sanepid discovered inappropriate food, water, and ready-to-serve food storage. Products were stored in invalid sanitary requirements conditions, and some of them exceeded the expiration date. 16000 water bottles were stored outside, unsecured and affected by weather conditions. Sanepid requested for an administrative penalty to a higher instance, and informed local Inspectorate for Environmental Protection (WIOŚ) about discovered "storage of a significant amount of waste".

Państwowa Inspekcja Pracy (labor inspection office) have started investigation concerning invalid employe time management, salary delays, invalid salary calculations, invalid national social insurance reports and calculations.

=== Fares and service ===
Initially RegioJet did not differentiate between classes, with seats in all coaches sold as second class. Later, the operator introduced four tariff zones on its commercial lines – the first and second tariff zone in two classes.

- Low cost (no service): second class with a reduced fare (not guaranteed for all lines) - open space coach, no drawers, bottled water is included in the fare price and a daily newspaper is available.
- Standard: second class – 6-person compartment, possibility of having a compartment for children and a quiet zone compartment, possibility of utilising the open space Astra coach with an entertainment programme in the in-built screens in each seat.
- Relax: second class – open space coach, possibility for separate seats, large tables.

In both Standard and Relax classes, passengers receive a daily newspaper and magazines, coffee and bottled water free of charge and at the same time may order other paid-for snack items from an onboard menu.

- Business: first class – compartment for 4 persons, possibility of a quiet zone compartment, free daily newspaper and economic magazines as well as coffee, cookies, high-quality teas, orange juice or Bohemia Sekt (sparkling wine).

An internet connection is available free of charge and the option to book a specific seat is available for all classes.

==== Coaches ====
All of the transporter's coaches have the corporate yellow outer paint and blue-red logo of the name REGIOJET. In addition, there is signate to denote the class, respective fares and pictograms of the offered services close to the entrance door.

In June 2011, RegioJet purchased 14 used coaches from Austrian operator ÖBB, which had been previously reconstructed to reach speeds of 200 km/h and retrofitted with AC, vacuum toilets and power sockets. They were transported to the Czech Republic in early June 2011 and late July 2011, before entering service in September 2011 having undergone a complete interior adjustment. Another 14 coaches were purchased in July 2011. All coaches (12 ABmz 61 81 30-90 coaches, 8 Ampz 61 81 18-91 coaches, 8 Bmz 61 81 21-90 coaches) were marked as second class by RegioJet, although for ÖBB these coaches and parts of the coaches of class A served as first class. It was reported that in January 2014, RegioJet had purchased another 45 coaches of the same series from ÖBB, with 27 of them first class coaches.

In September 2014 at InnoTrans, the Slovak company Molpir, the supplier of the FUNTORO on-board entertainment system, introduced a high-capacity coach for RegioJet from Romanian manufacturer Astra Vagoane Călători. The coach was designed under cooperation with the interior studio Flagu-Coplass and architect Patrik Kotas. The coaches have seats from German company GRAMMER and feature a TV screen for each seat. Each coach costs approximately €1 mil. 10 coaches were ordered in total, to be put into operation in the following months.

At the end of 2017, the transporter purchased 6 coaches from the bankrupt open-access operator Arenaways – they were manufactured in 2010 and operated for several months in Italy before being purchased by RegioJet. The company ordered another 10 Astra coaches from the Romanian producer.

==== Diesel multiple units ====
RegioJet used 9 3-coach Bombardier Talent DMUs in Slovakia, leased from Alpha Trains.

== RegioJet rolling stock ==
=== Locomotives ===
==== Škoda 99E2 / 69E5 ====
In 2010 RegioJet acquired 9 Škoda 99E1 locomotives from Ferrovie Nord Milano who originally bought them in the 1990s from Škoda and modified them for the needs of Italian railways. In the cab the control panel was moved to the left, the brake resistors on the roof were lowered and capacitors were moved under the frame as well as some minor changes. After the acquisition by RegioJet most modifications were reversed, the control panel was moved back to the right and the capacitors were moved back in the engine room, but the brake resistors were kept lower as they did not interfere with anything. Additionally the gear ratio in the transmissions was changed to allow the speed limit to be raised from 120 km/h to 140 km/h and a new train protection system was installed.

In 2025 a modernisation project has started. All 9 locomotives will be rebuilt into class 362.2. They will go through extensive repairs, equipment for AC traction will be installed, along with ETCS and new digital gauges.

==== Siemens Vectron ====
In 2014 RegioJet leased its first three Vectron Locomotives from ELL for the line Bratislava-Košice, over time with the start of new lines Regiojet leased more of these locomotives, which he had a buy out deal for. They could be bought out for a lower price after leasing them for 10 years. However RegioJet opted to not pursue that deal and by 2024 all locomotives from the original deal were returned to ELL.

==== Bombardier TRAXX MS 2e ====
In 2017 Regiojet signed a contract with Bombardier Transportation for 4 locomotives TRAXX MS 2e with the option for 20 more, they were delivered in two batches of two locomotives in 2018 and entered service shortly after, however the option to buy more was never used as the two parties agreed on a contract for a newer type of locomotiove.

==== Bombardier/Alstom TRAXX 3 MS ====
In 2019 RegioJet announced the follow up to the MS 2e contract, they would buy fifteen locomotives from Bombardier Transportation of the new TRAXX 3 MS type with the option for dozens more. First two locomotives were delivered in December 2020, another six were delivered in the first half of 2021 and the last seven came in the second half of 2021. Shortly after the last of the fifteen locomotives entered service, RegioJet announced they use the option and buy three more locomotives, this time from Alstom as their acquisition of Bombardier Transportation went through in 2021. These three were delivered in December 2022. In 2023 RegioJet announced another batch was coming, this time thirteen locomotives would strengthen their fleet. Last of this batch entered into service in July 2025.

In 2024, after a serious accident in Pardubice, one locomotive was taken out of service and has yet to be repaired.

==== ČKD locomotives ====
In 2026 Regiojet owns three locomotives from ČKD. First one was a class 721, which they acquired in 2010 mainly to take coaches and locomotives for maintenance to their depot at Praha-Zličín which is only accessible though unelectrified tracks. In 2017 they acquired a second locomotive, Class 740 which took over the workload of the class 721 which was then repurposed for in-station shunting at Praha-Smíchov. The class 721 took over in 2021 again after the Class 740 went through some major maintenance, it happened again in 2023 after the class 740 broke down and had to get some major repairs done in the engine block. In late 2023 both locomotives were used interchangeably. In late 2024 the class 721 was retired after a fault in the engine block made it inoperable. The third locomotive of Class 730 was acquired by RegioJet in 2025 as a replacement for the broken down and retired class 721.

==== Class 703 ====
In 2013 Regiojet acquired this small diesel locomotive for light shunting in the Smíchov station, in 2019 it was lent to DYKO Kolín and returned in 2023 after a renovation and a fresh coat of paint. It was not yet needed in 2023 but in 2024 with the move to Malešice due to the Smíchov station being completely rebuilt the locomotive found a new life as it was being used to shunt locomotives for maintenance from the station Praha-Hostivař to a maintenance hall in a rail yard in Dolní Měcholupy.

Locomotives
Class	Type	Picture	Production	Manufacturer	N°	V Max	Traction	Primary Services	Note
162	99E2		1992	Škoda Plzeň	1 (8)	140 km/h	Electric DC	Košice - Čop	Bought from Ferrovie Nord Milano Modernisation into 362.2 started in 2025
362.2	69E5		1992	Škoda Plzeň	8 (1)	140 km/h	Electric AC/DC	-	Modernised in 2026 from class 162
193 (D)	Vectron		Since 2010	Siemens Mobility	1 + 5	160 km/h 200 km/h	Electric AC/DC	-	Leased by CT Train for operations in Poland 1 as backup, rest leased forward
386.2	TRAXX F140 MS 2e		2018	Bombardier Transportation	4	140 km/h (160 km/h)	Electric AC/DC	Line R8 Brno-Bohumín	-Leasing by UniCredit -160 km/h only on CZ and SK with ETCS turned off
388.2	TRAXX 3 F160 MS		Since 2020	Bombardier Transportation Alstom	31	160 km/h	Electric AC/DC	All lines	388.205 out of service after the accident in Pardubice in June 2024
730			1989	ČKD	1 + 1	80 km/h	Diesel-electric	Shunting and manipulation trais around Prague	Bought as a replacement for the broken down loco class 721 Second loco leased from KDS
740			1984	ČKD	1	70 km/h	Diesel-electric	Shunting and manipulation trais around Prague	
703			1976	TSM	1	40 km/h	Diesel	Shunting in Dolní Měcholupy private rail yard	
721			1965	ČKD	1	80 km/h	Diesel-electric	Shunting and manipulation trais around Prague	since 10/2024 definitevely out of service for a fault in the engine block

=== Multiple Units ===
==== Diesel units ====
The first multiple units in the typical yellow livery were these two diesel units, First it was the Siemens Desiro that was used for marketing tours around the Czech Republic, then the Bombardier Talent that was used in Slovakia on the line between Bratislava and Komárno. The most recently used diesel unit on lines operated by Regiojet is the German Class 628 that also ran on the Bratislava-Komárno line, later on lines in the Ústí nad Labem region and last on a PID line as a replacement for a broken down unit.

==== Electric units ====
===== Pesa 654 & 655 =====
After RegioJet won a contract in 2019 for lines in the Ústí nad Labem region, seven two-car units were ordered to serve those lines. They were delivered in 2022 with a year long delay. Similarly after Regiojet won a contract for two lines in Prague that would start in December 2024, seven three-car units were ordered, however this time Pesa was several months late with the delivery and so older class 628 diesel units ran on one line while the second brand new line ws postponed until delivery in spring 2025.

===== CRRC Sirius =====
After LeoExpress withdrew from their contract with the Chinese manufacturer, RegioJet stepped up and in cooperation with CRRC finished the mandatory testing. Afterwards Regiojet leased the three units for operations on the R23 line form Kolín to Ústí nad Labem which saved them from fines as the line was contractually obligated to have low floor accessible vehicles in the year following the lease agreement.

===== Škoda EMUs =====
After Regiojet won a major contract for lines in the Ústí nad Labem region they were looking to Pesa to supply the trainsets for those lines but with Pesa being very busy and not being able to meet deadlines, Regiojet was forced to make the hard decision and go looking elsewhere if they wanted to avoid fines. That is where Škoda came in and offered their proven RegioPanter platform. Fifteen three-car and eight two-car units were ordered and have started deliveries and testing in early 2026 and are set to enter service by the end of the year.

===== Pesa 666 & 667 =====
After Regiojet won the contract for the national Line R9 from Prague through Havlíčkov Brod to Jihlava or Brno, they announced that Pesa would be supplying the brand new trainsets. The trains will have a maximum speed of 200 km/h, a first for Pesa, there will be two type-11 four-segment units and seven three-segment units. However Pesa is supposedly delayed with the production of these trains as only one has been seen outside of the factory in June 2026. The trains are supposed to enter service in December 2026.

Multiple Units
Class	Type	Picture	Production	Manufacturer	N°	Vmax	Traction	Primary Services	Start of operation	Note
654	Elf.eu		2021	Pesa Bydgoszcz	7	160 km/h	Electric AC/DC	DÚK Lines	since 2022	
655	Elf.eu		2024 - 2025	Pesa Bydgoscz	7	160 km/h	Electric AC/DC	Lines PID S49 and S61	since 2025	
665	Sirius		2019	CRRC	3	160 km/h	Electric AC/DC	Line R23	since 2024	Leased from the manufacturer until the end of contract for line R23
640	15 Ev		2025-2026	Škoda Group	(15 ordered)	160 km/h	Electric AC/DC	DÚK Lines	Since 2026	
650	20 Ev		2026	Škoda Group	(8 ordered)	160 km/h	Electric AC/DC	DÚK Lines	Since 2026	
666	InterRegio 200		2026-	Pesa Bydgoszcz	(11 ordered)	200 km/h	Electric AC/DC	Line R9	Expected start in timetable 26/27	
667	InterRegio 200		2026-	Pesa Bydgoszcz	(7 ordered)	200 km/h	Electric AC/DC	Line R9	Expected start in timetable 26/27	

No longer operated vehicles
Class	Type	Picture	Production	Manufacturer	N°	Vmax	Traction	Primary services	Start/End of operation	Note
643 (D)	Talent			Bombardier Transportation	9	140 km/h	Diesel	Bratislava–Komárno	2012-2020	Leased from Alpha Trains
642 (D)	Desiro			Siemens Mobility	4	120 km/h	Diesel	Marketing trips around the Czech Republic	2010-2010	Leased from Alpha Trains
628			1987	Düwag / Linke-Hofmann-Busch	9	120 km/h	Diesel	-DÚK lines -PID S49 -Bratislava–Komárno	2016 - 2025	Three have been sold Two are still operational but not used Four are out of service

=== Gallery ===
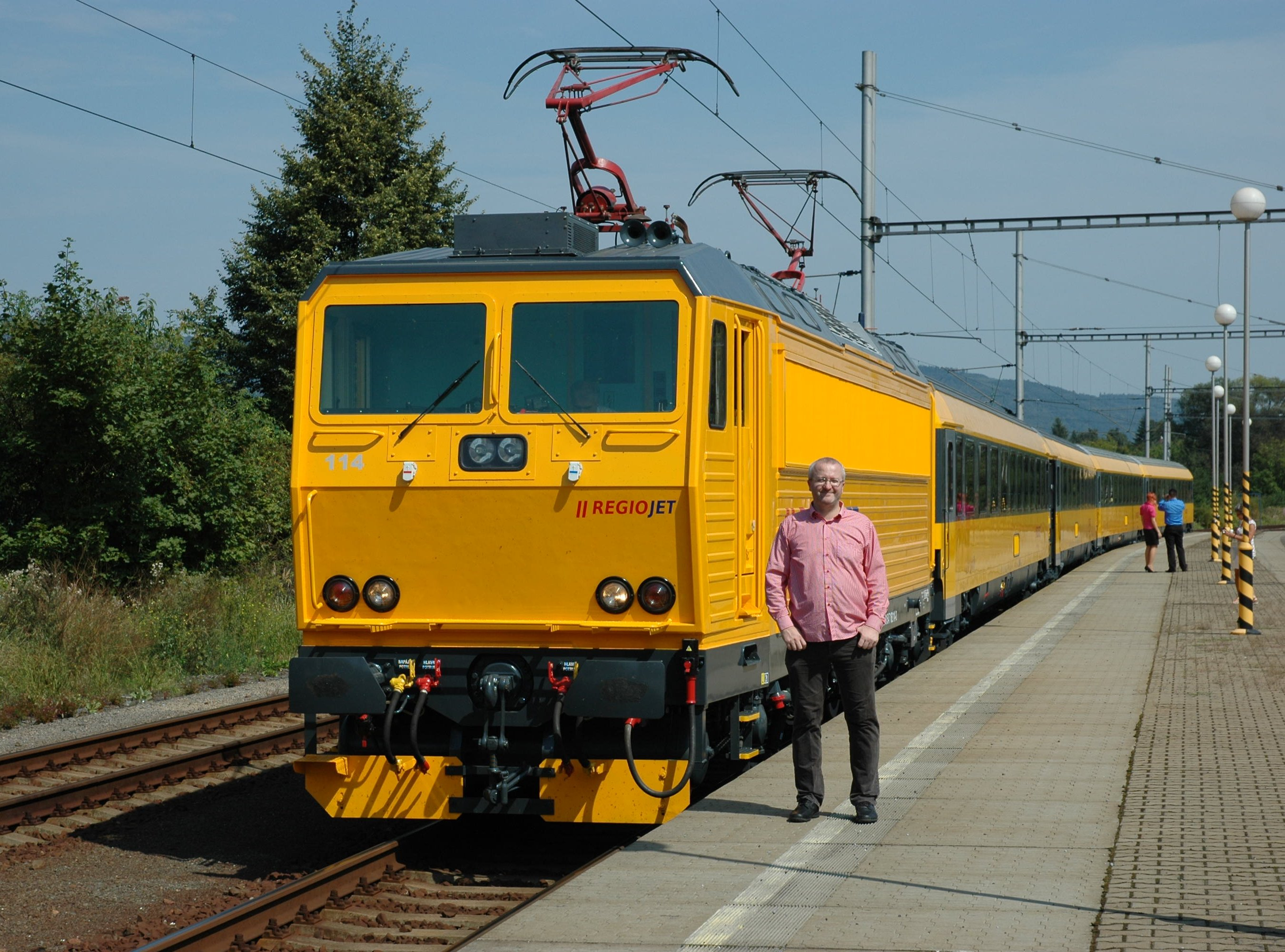
RegioJet's CEO Radim Jančura in front of a train serving the Havířov–Prague route

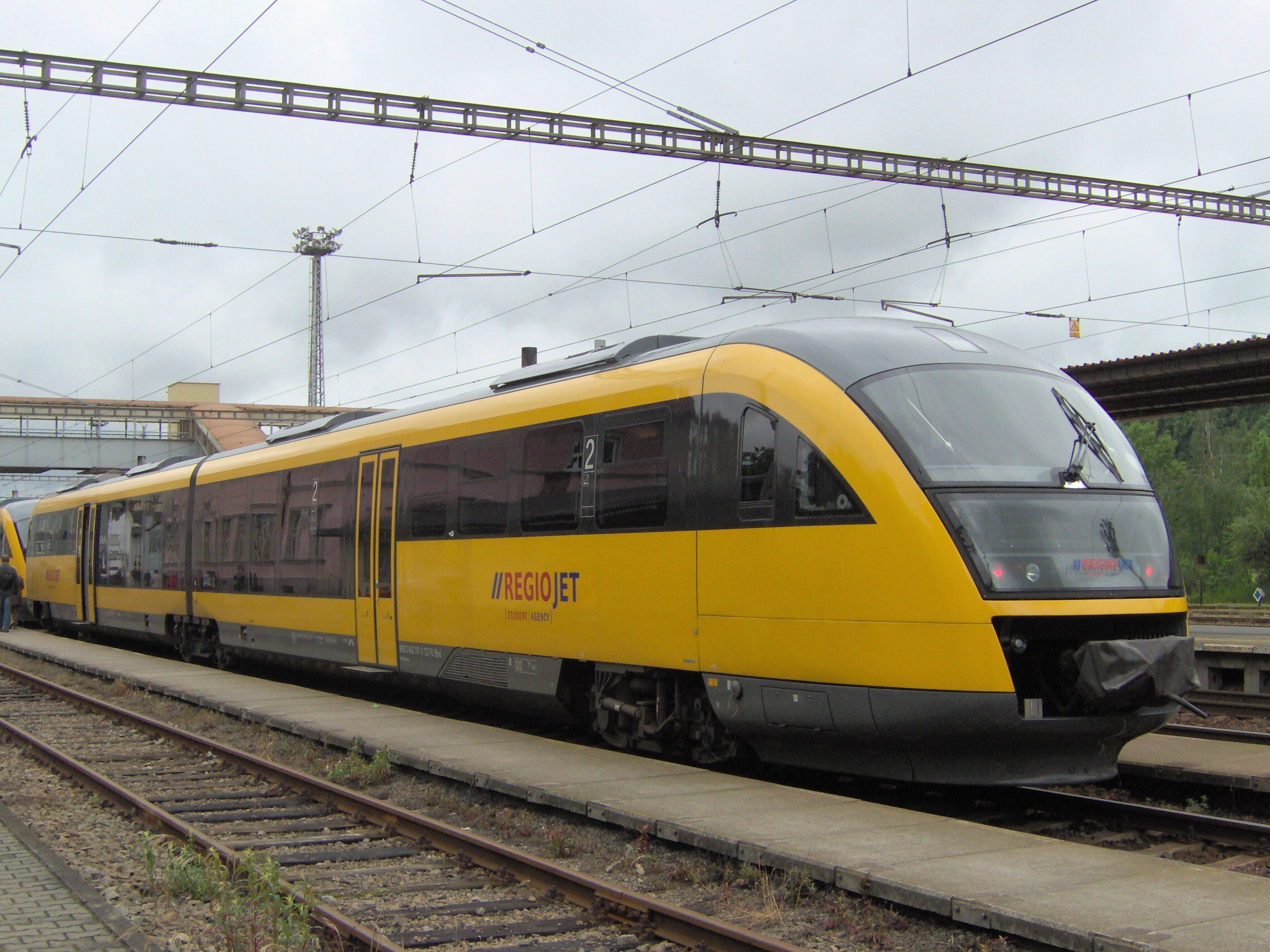
A Desiro in RegioJet livery at Skalice nad Svitavou

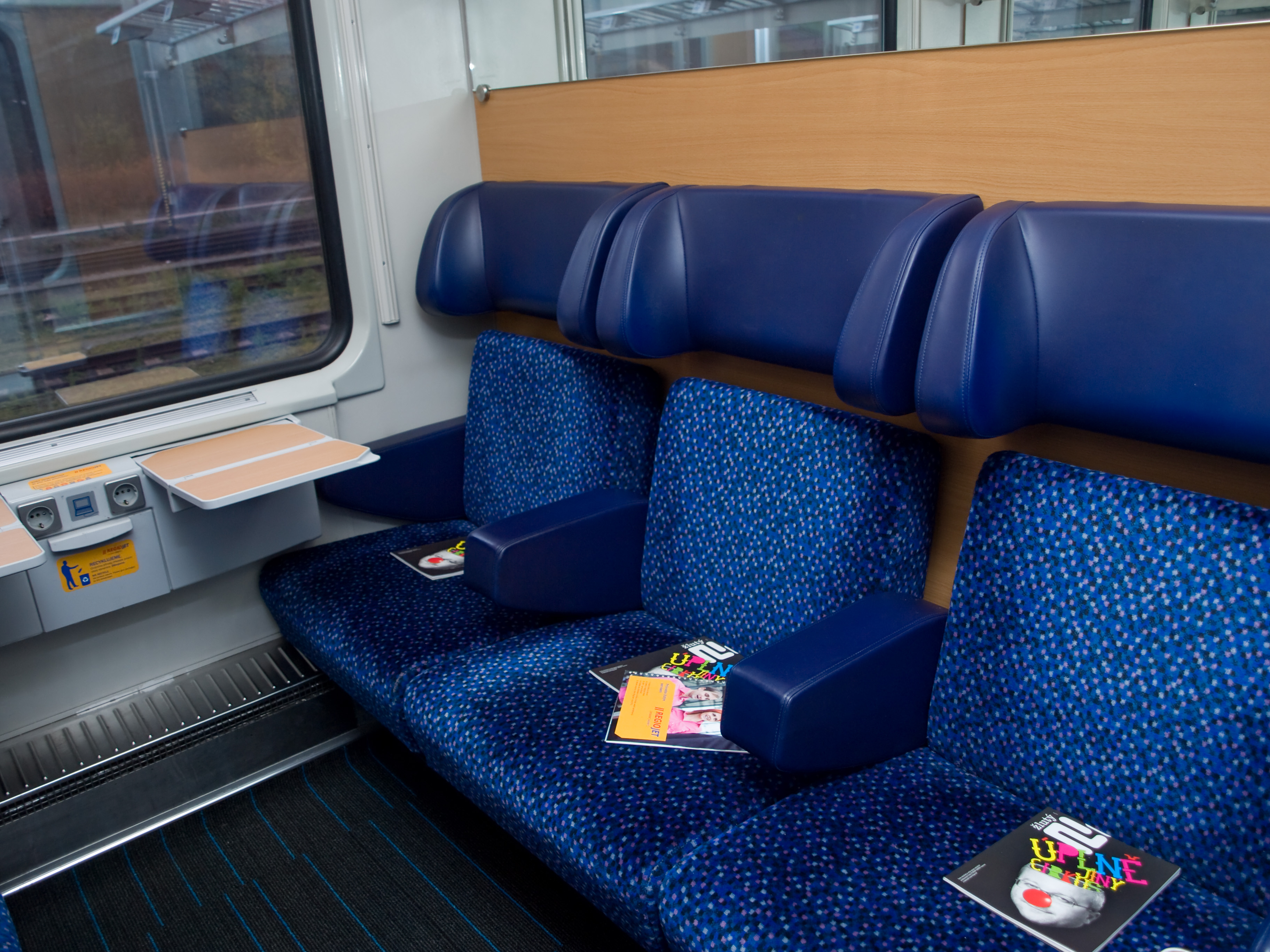
Standard class (cloth)

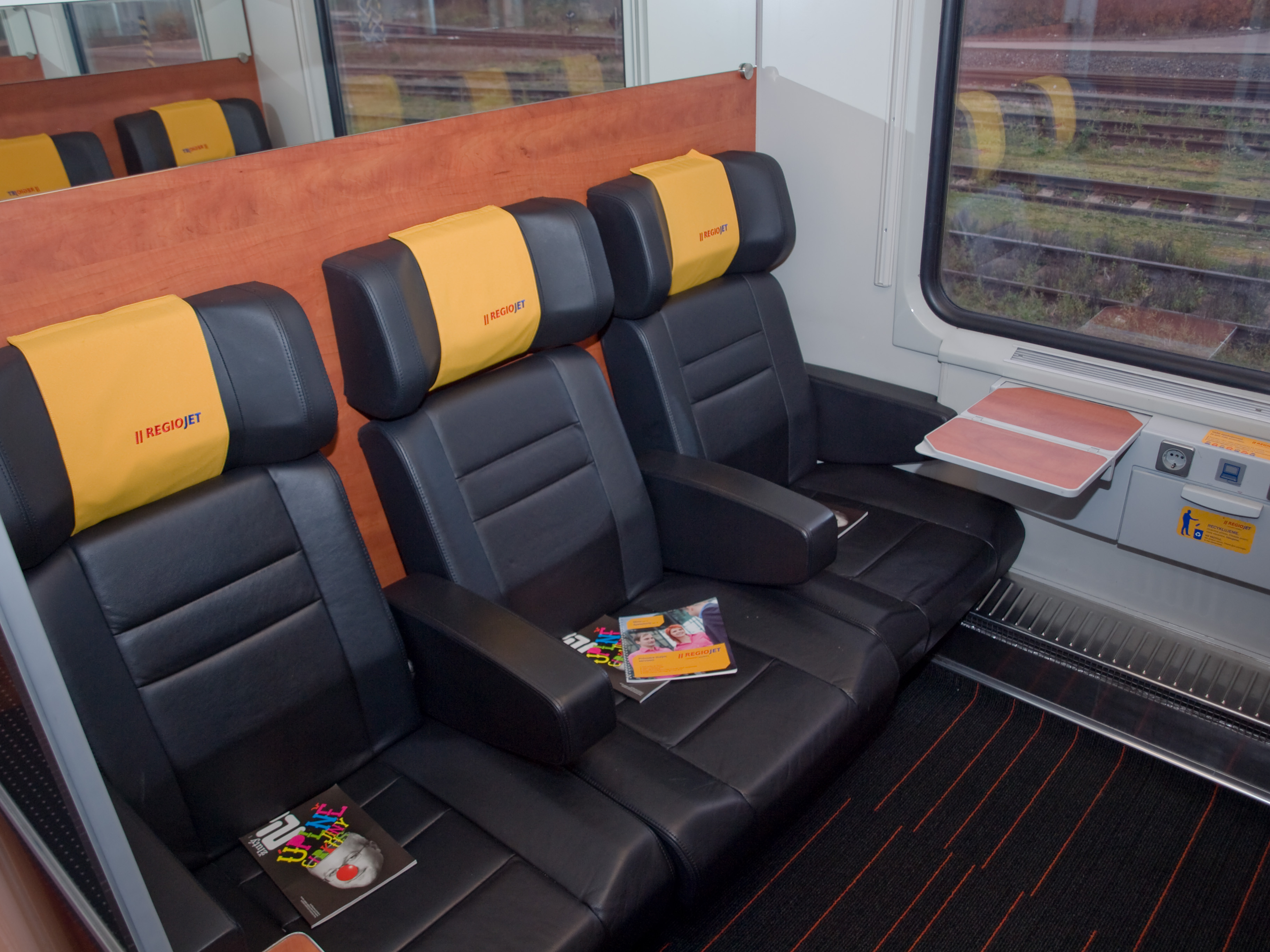
Standard class (leather)

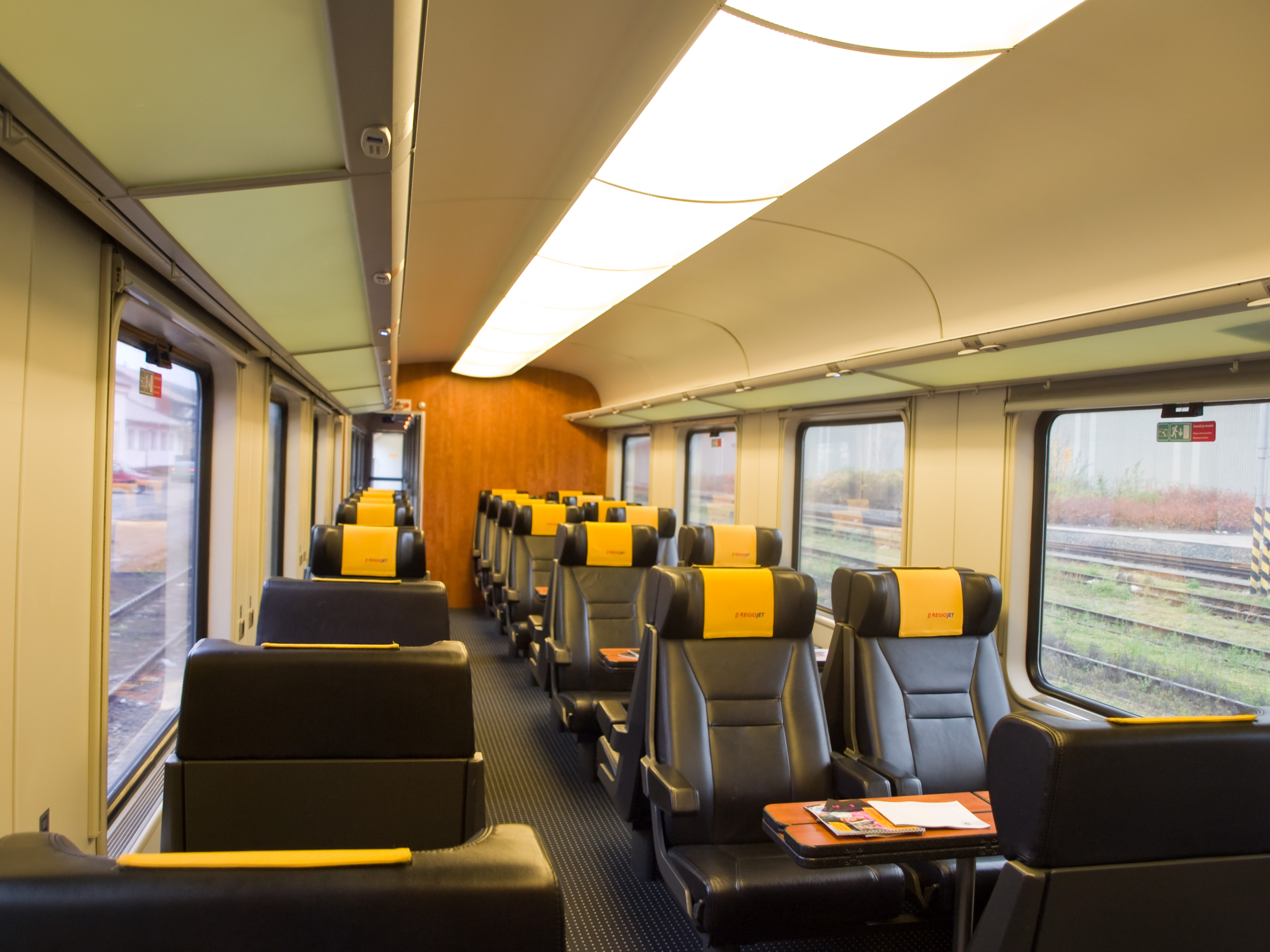
Relax class

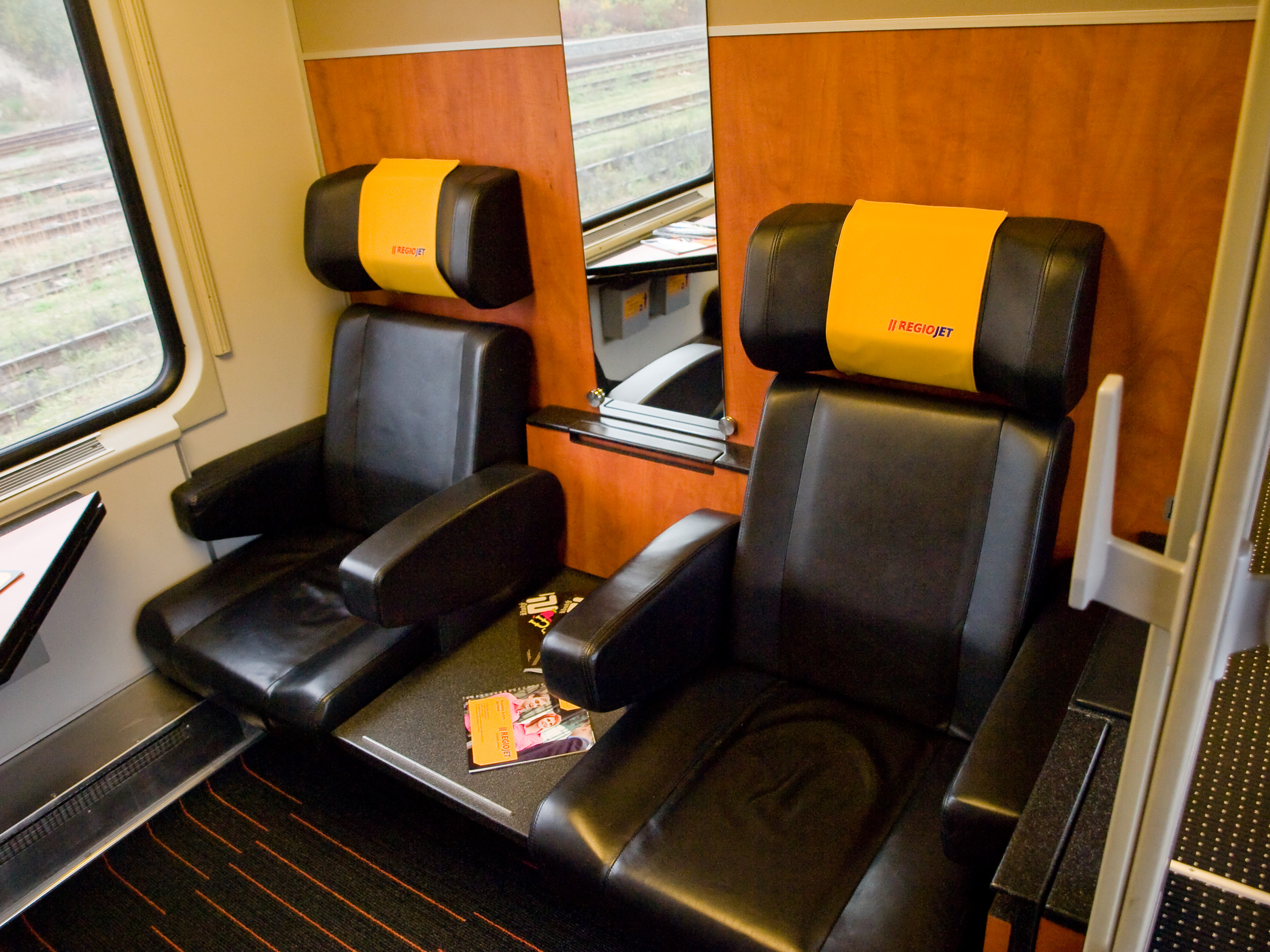
Business class

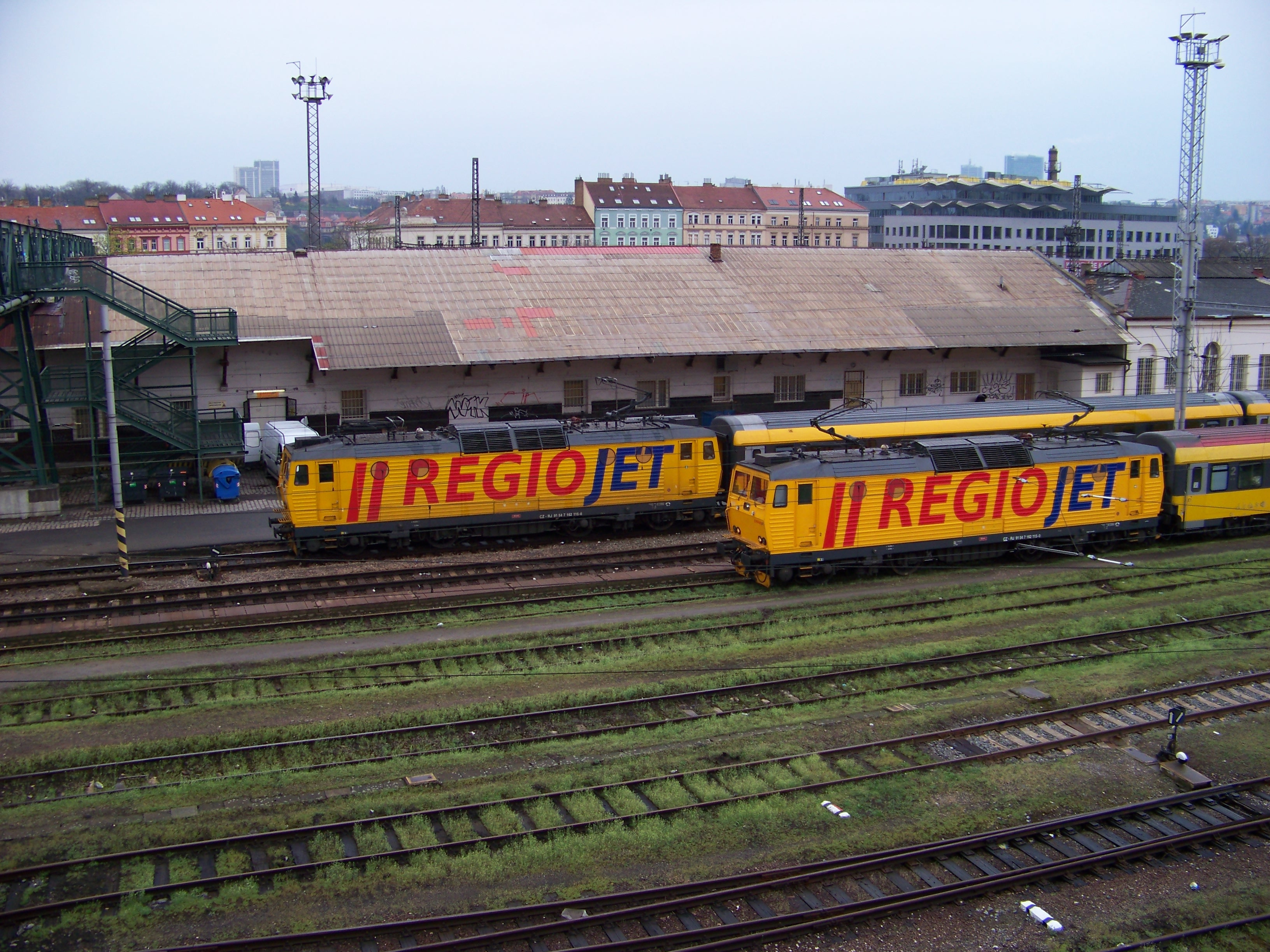
Former depot of Regiojet in Praha-Smíchov
