= Timber king =

Timber king may refer to:

- Burhan Uray (1931–2018), Chinese-born Indonesian businessman
- Dan Singh Bisht (1906–1964), Indian businessman
- Friedrich Weyerhäuser (1834–1914), German-born American businessman
