= Stars Gathering =

Taiwanese TV show

- 群星會
- Genre: variety show
- Based on: Taiwan (Republic of China)
- Original language: Mandarin

Production
- Producer: Cheung Fu
- Running time: 30 minutes
- Production company: Fu Kit Communications Ltd.

Original release
- Network: Taiwan Television
- Release: 10 October 1962 – 12 April 2006

Stars Gathering is a Mandarin-language singing variety show that has been broadcast by Taiwan Television Enterprise, Ltd.(TTV) since its inception on October 10, 1962. The producer was Guan Hua-shi, and the host was Shen Chih. It was the first TV singing program in Taiwan's television history if the programs during the trial period were excluded from the calculation. The show underwent three name revisions, initially known as "Music and Dance – Stars Gathering" (音樂歌舞——群星會), followed by "Mandarin Songs – Stars Gathering" (國語歌曲——群星會), and eventually "Stars Gathering".

== History ==
The concept was originally inspired by the live singing show "Golden Age of Songs"(歌壇春秋). The band leader Guan Hua-shi and singer Shen Chih brought the format to television and named it Stars Gathering. Commencing from October 10, 1962, "Stars Gathering" aired two weekly episodes, each spanning 30 minutes. Shen Zhi hosted the show while Guan Hua-shi led his own exclusive band and played the violin. The majority of the singers came from Taipei's "New Nanyang Singing Hall". "Stars Gathering" often arranged for male and female dancers to accompany the performers or showcased performances by renowned dancers like Cao Jin-ling and Cui Rong-rong. Shen Zhi was instrumental in designing costumes for the singers and also wrote articles for TTV's publication "TV Weekly" introducing the performers and promoting the program. During that era of black and white television, it was crucial to ensure that performers did not wear costumes with too many sequins during filming as it would cause unclear imagery due to the reflection of sequins. Hence, Shen Zhi's role in designing the costumes was essential.

In July 1967, "Stars Gathering" reached a significant milestone by broadcasting its 500th episode with 17 guest singers. On December 7, 1969, at 1:20 pm, Taiwan Television (TTV) aired a trial run of their self-produced color TV program "Stars Gathering," becoming the first live program in Taiwan to test color signals. Bai Jia-li kicked off the show by performing "A Rose on the Ridge" (隴上一朵玫瑰花). On April 12, 1970, at exactly 1:18 pm, TTV broadcast "Stars Gathering" live on location, using two Philips PC-80 color cameras that arrived 52 hours earlier. This momentous event made "Stars Gathering" the first live color program to air in Taiwan, solidifying its place as a pioneer in the television industry.

On April 5, 1975, President of the Republic of China Chiang Kai-shek died, and as a result, Stars Gathering announced a temporary halt to its broadcast in the winter of that year. It resumed airing in April 1976. The show went off the air on March 29, 1977, after a total of 1283 episodes.

During the height of its popularity, participation in "Stars Gathering" was considered a significant boost to a singer's career. The show popularized the performance style of male-female duets, such as Qing Shan and Wan Qu, Xia Xin and Zhang Ming-li, Xie Lei and Zhang Qi, Yu Tian and Qin Mi, among others.

== Theme song ==
In April 1963, Shen Chih composed and wrote the Mandarin song "Ode to the Stars" as the theme song for "Stars Gathering." Whenever audiences hear the tune they will think of "Stars Gathering" and eagerly anticipate each episode's broadcast. The lyrics to "Ode to the stars" are as follows:

Stars shine in the sky, flowers bloom on the ground,

We have beautiful fantasies, why not sing together?

We also wish to spread joy around you like the stars,

And make your life more fragrant like the flowers.

Friends, come and sing with us,

Let's fill the world with new hope.

== Follow-up ==
- In 1982, TTV celebrated the 20th anniversary of "Stars Gathering" by airing a special program called "Variety Show"(綜藝大出擊), produced by TTV's programming department. The program was hosted by Chang Li-min and Yu Tian and featured clips of Qing Shan hosting the "Stars Gathering". In May 2020, the full version of "Variety Show" was released on the official TTV YouTube channel.
- In May 1983, TTV aired a special program titled "Remembrance of the Stars: In Memory of Guan Hua-shi" (懷念群星會：紀念關華石) to commemorate the passing of Guan Hua-shi. The program was hosted by Lei Ming.
- From September 15, 1985, to March 30, 1986, Taiwan Television Corporation (TTV) aired "Group Star Fly" (群星飛躍), a singing program produced by Jiang Ji-xiong and Cui Chang-hua and hosted by Fang Fangfang. The program, which aired every Sunday from 5:00 to 6:00 pm, featured a large number of veteran singers from Stars Gathering who sang classic songs from the 1960s in a soothing atmosphere.
- On October 10, 1987, TTV celebrated its 25th anniversary with a special program called "A Hundred Minutes of Review" (一百分鐘回顧). Hosted by Shen Chi, the program featured singers from "Stars Gathering" performing 25 famous songs, accompanied by set designs and artistic designs reminiscent of the original show.
- In April 1988, TTV broadcast a special program titled "Ode to the Stars: An Album in Memory of Shenzhi"(群星頌：懷念慎芝zhuan) to honor the passing of Shen Chi. The program was produced by TTV's program department, with Pang Yi-an serving as the producer, Chen Jun-tian as the scriptwriter, and Huang Chi-hung as the art director. Li Li-hsia, a TTV announcer, narrated the program, while Chang Kuang-hsun, a production assistant of "Stars Gathering," directed the program, and Kuo-Tung Hsu served as the camera operator. Many of Shen Chi's closest friends and the stars of "Stars Gathering" were involved in the program.
- Stars Gathering was aired briefly again in 1993 and 1994. It was hosted by Zhao Ning and accompanied by the TTV Orchestra. The show originally aired on November 21, 1993, from 23:10 to 00:40, and then every Monday and Tuesday from February 14 to April 13, 1994, from 23:00 to 23:30. It was called "The Second-Generation Stars Gathering".
- On May 7, 1998, a concert was held at the Sun Yat-sen Memorial Hall in Taipei to commemorate the 10th anniversary of Shenzhi's death. The event was organized by Bao Rong, the director of the Cross-Straits Academic and Cultural Exchange Association and a member of the Arts and Cultural Exchange Committee. The concert was titled "1998 Group Concert of Remembrance Songs" (1998群星會懷念歌曲演唱會).
- In 2002, on the eve of its 40th anniversary, the General Manager of Taiwan Television (TTV), Hu Yuan-hui, the Deputy General Managers, Gu An-sheng and Shi Huan-lin, personally cooked a special TV dinner named "TTV Chang Hong"(台視長) under the guidance of Fu Pei-mei. The dishes were named after classic TTV programs, including "A Dowry for a Carriage" (嫁妝一牛車), "Rogue Professor" (流氓教授), "Stars Gathering," "Eight Thousand Li of Cloud and Moon" (八千里路雲和月) and "Strong batting" (強棒出擊).
- On January 24, 2005, "Taiwan Television Stars Gathering", produced by Zhang Fu and hosted by Ye Ai-ling and Xu Xiao-shun, began airing, and was referred to as the "third generation of Stars Gathering." After Xu Xiao-shun resigned, Ye Ai-ling and Luo Shi-feng took over as hosts. The program was discontinued on April 12, 2006.
- After the broadcast of "Taiwan Television Stars Gathering" was discontinued, from 2008 to 2009, Taiwan Interactive Television Company (TITV) purchased the internet broadcasting rights of "Taiwan Television Stars Gathering" and renamed it "Asian Stars Night "(亞洲群星會)which was broadcast on the Asian Fusion Channel (then Chunghwa Telecom MOD channel 33).
- On May 8, 2011, Hua Feng Culture organized a concert titled "2011 Golden Melody Awards Concert – Stars Singing and Celebrating 50 Years" (2011金嗓金曲演唱會- 群星歡唱50年)at the Sun Yat-sen Memorial Hall in Taipei. The event featured several singers from "Stars Gathering", including Wang Hui-lian, Kong Lan-xun, Wu Jing-han, Qing Shan, Jin Yan, Mei Dai, Ji Lu-xia, Qin Mi, Sun Pu-sheng, Tsai Yi-hong, Yan He-ting, and Yi Ru, who performed at the concert. Former TTV orchestra conductor Yang Shui-jin also called upon musicians who had previously served as accompanists for "Stars Gathering" to accompany the performers.
- In a January 28, 2020, interview with the Central News Agency (CNA), Bai Jia-li revealed that singers were paid NT$750 for each performance on "Stars Gathering", while she received NT$6,000 for hosting an episode of the show. She further stated that grassroots civil servants in Taiwan earned around NT$1,600 per month in the 1970s.
