= Media-on-demand =

Interactive systems provided with video-on-demand

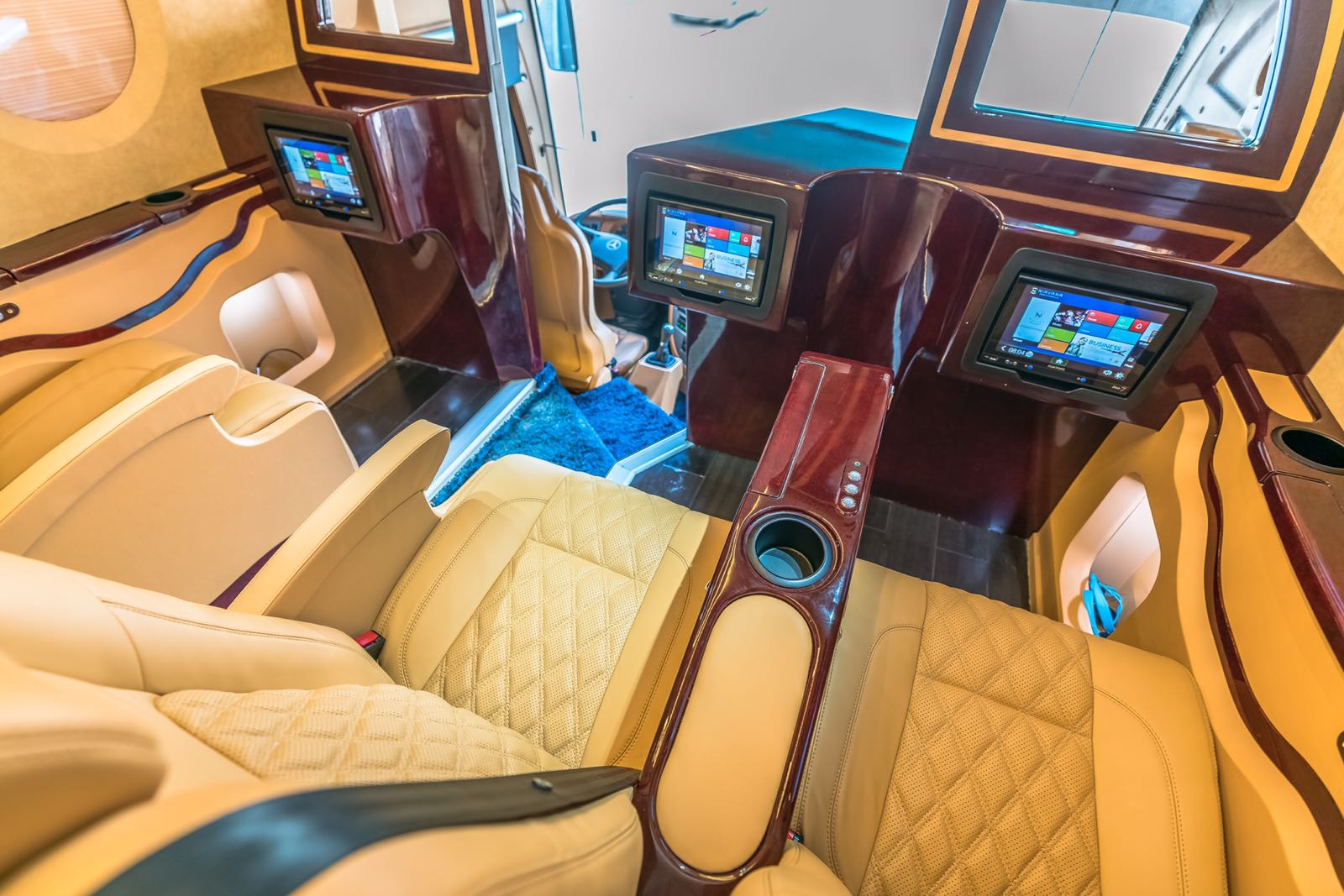
FUNTORO media-on demand system in a bus

Media on demand (MOD) is a new generation of video on demand which not only allows users to watch and listen to audio and video content such as movies and TV shows, but also provides facilities including real-time information, interactive games, attractions guidance, route information, advertising systems, and services for shopping and ordering. Users can select content whenever they want, rather than having to watch it at a specific broadcast time.

In the transportation industry, media-on-demand technology was first applied by FUNTORO, which offer media on demand as in-vehicle infotainment to bus and railway passengers through high-definition interactive monitors embedded in seatback or armrest.

Some telecommunication companies offer media-on-demand service by transmitting a digital signal to a set-top box that is connected to a television screen or other display devices. Clients are typically required to pay a monthly fee to get access to a bundle of multimedia content.

== See also ==
- Non-linear media
- FUNTORO
- Video on demand
- In vehicle infotainment
- MOD Technology
