= Bai Jia-li =

Taiwanese actress, singer, and TV presenter

Bai Jia-li 白嘉莉
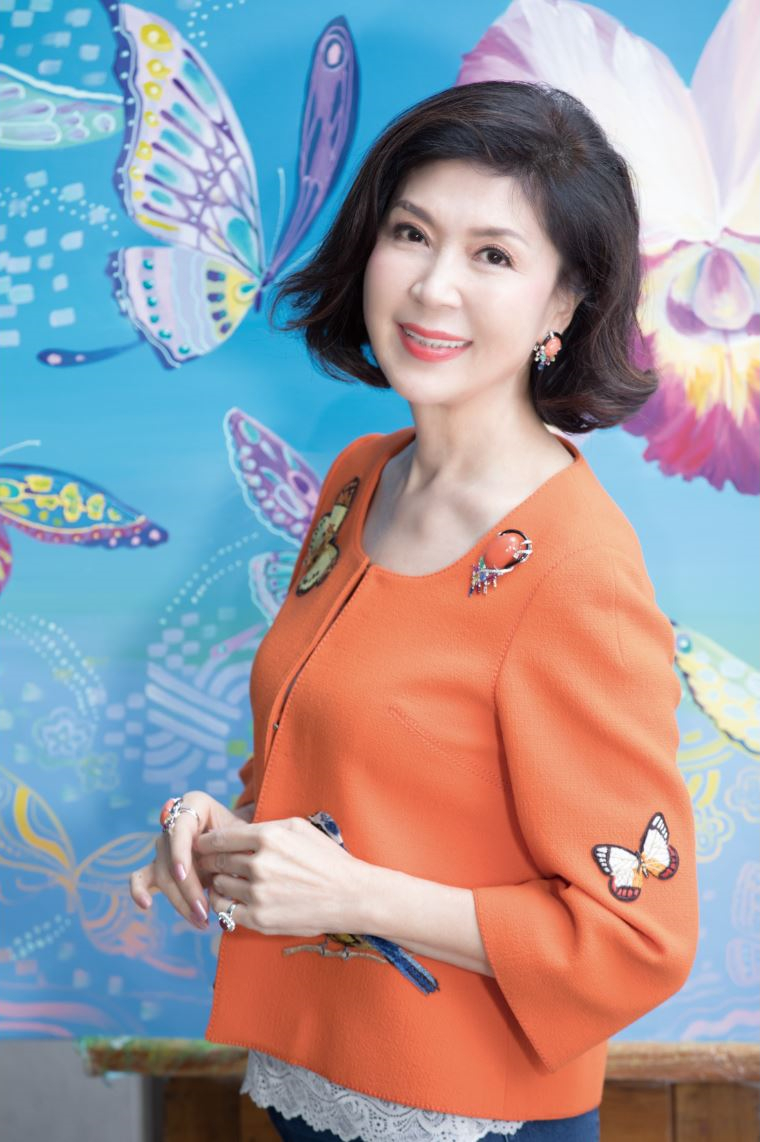

Background information
- Born: March 1, 1948 (age 78); Lanzhou, Gansu Province, Republic of China
- Origin: Taiwan; Indonesia
- Occupations: Actor, painter, philanthropist, singer, television presenter, writer

Bai Jia-li (Chinese: 白嘉莉; pinyin: Bái Jiālì; born on March 1, 1948 in Lanzhou, Gansu Province), also known as Pai Chia-li or Betty Pai, is a Taiwanese actress, singer, and TV presenter.

== Biography ==
Bai Jia-li was born on March 1, 1948 in Lanzhou, Gansu Province. For generations, her family had lived in Dihua (modern-day Ürümqi), Xinjiang. Bai grew up in a military dependents' village (Chinese: 眷村) near the Shuinan Air Force Base (simplified Chinese: 水湳空军基地; traditional Chinese: 水湳空軍基地; pinyin: Shuǐnǎn Kōng Jūn Jīdì) in Taichung, Taiwan. She dropped out of high school due to her parents' divorce and went to Taipei City to participate in a singing competition, where she won first prize. Later, she signed a contract with a Taiwan Television Enterprise to host a singing program, where she set a precedent for interviewing guests in English, Japanese and French, and became known as the "most beautiful program host".

On December 7, 1969, TCTV (Taiwan Television Enterprise, Ltd.) tried out a self-produced color television program with Stars Gathering, which was the first live program in Taiwan's television history to try out a color program signal. Bai sang "A Rose on the Long Shang" in the show's first airing.

In 1977, Bai married Chinese Indonesian businessman Burhan Uray, also known as Huang Shuang-an (simplified Chinese: 黄双安; traditional Chinese: 黃雙安; pinyin: Huáng Shuāng'ān), nicknamed the "King of Timber" (Chinese: 木材大王). She later withdrew from the performing art business to support her husband's developing career. In 1979, the pair moved to Indonesia.

Bai has hosted singing shows as "Stars on Stage" and "Galaxy Palace" (Chinese: 銀河璇宮) and has released five albums: "The Endless Wine" (Chinese: 喝不完的酒), "Lovely Stranger" (Chinese: 可愛的陌生人), "Blue Streetcar" (Chinese: 藍色的街車), "See You Again in Dreams" (Chinese: 夢裡再見) and "Love in the Heart" (Chinese: 愛在心裡).

In January 2020, Bai released her autobiography, "Bai Jia-li Looking Back" (Chinese: 回眸), and moved back to Taiwan. She plans to exhibit her paintings and engage in philanthropy instead of returning to the performing arts industry.

== Family ==
Bai's father, Bai Quan-zuo (Chinese: 白全佐; pinyin: Bái Quánzuǒ), was a retired Air Force officer of Taiwan the Republic of China. He introduced light aircraft to Taiwan and had once mentored television personality Chang Fei. Bai's mother first settled in Melbourne and eventually the Gold Coast, Australia. Her sister, Bai Fei-bi (Chinese: 白菲比; pinyin: Bái Fēibǐ), also known as Phoebe Bai, has also worked in the entertainment industry as a journalist and news presenter for the Australian Broadcasting Corporation (ABC).

== Publication ==
=== Book ===
- Love in the Woods: A Love relationship with Huang Shuang-an" (Chinese: 愛在林深處：情牽黃雙安), published by Haichao Photography and Art Publish Co. (Chinese: 海潮攝影藝術出版社), on November 1, 2010, ISBN 978-7806916193.
- Bai Jia-li Looking Back (Chinese: 回眸), published by China Times Publishing Co. (Chinese: 時報文化) on February 4, 2020, ISBN 978-9571358376.

== Performance works ==
=== Drama ===
- 1970 "The Howling Wind" (Chinese: 風蕭蕭), broadcast by Taiwan Television Enterprise, Ltd. (TTV), as Bai Pin

=== Movie ===
- 1969 "The Bride and I" (Chinese: 新娘與我)
- 1971 "Hotel Royal" (Chinese: 老爺酒店)
- 1971 "The Past Can Only Be Remembered" (Chinese: 往事只能回味）
- 1971 "I'll Always Be Yours" (Chinese: 我永遠是你的）
- 1971 "The Heroic Huo Yuanjia" (Chinese: 豪俠霍元甲) as Chang Pei-lan
- 1972 "A Young Man’s Heart" (Chinese: 寸草稚子心)
- 1972 "Blood Splashing Rainbow Bridge" (Chinese: 血濺虹橋)

== Music ==
=== Album ===
Date	Album	The Label	Song
1968	See You Again 再會!再會	Hai Shen Record label Co, Ltd. 海山唱片	Track: 1. Midnight kiss(午夜香吻); 2. Memories Left(空留回憶); 3. Lock Of Love(情鎖); 4. Love in South China Sea(南海之戀); 5. Recall with Love(留戀); 6. Lover's Tears(情人的眼淚); 7. Late Night Return(夜歸人); 8. The Past Illusion(過去的春夢); 9. Sorrow in Autumn(秋愁); 10. Who Cares(誰要你理睬); 11. See You Again (再會 ! 再會)
1968	Autumn Fantasy 秋的幻想	Universal Music Taiwan 環球唱片	Track: 1. Autumn Fantasy(秋的幻想); 2. Love Waves(愛波盪漾); 3. I Wanna Wait For You(我要等著; 4. Arirang(阿里郎); 5. Tune of Heart(心弦之歌); 6. I Can't Forget You(忘不了的你); 7. Falling Flowers& Flowing Stream(落花流水); 8. Vietnamese Love Song(越南情歌); 9. Hazy Light(朦朧的燈光); 10. Dreamed(夢去了)
1971	The Endless Drink 喝不完的酒	Hai Shen Record label Co, Ltd. 海山唱片	Track: 1. Warm Heart All Around World(溫情滿人間); 2. Easy To Love, Hard To Forget(愛你容易忘你難); 3. No More Heart Break(不要再心酸); 4. You Are with Me(有我就有你); 5. Forget Me From Now On(從今以後忘了我); 6. The Endless Drink喝不完的酒; 7. The sentimentalist(愛人是個多情人); 8. Tonight, Taipei Without You(今夜台北沒有你); 9. I Won't Hold You Back(你要走我不留); 10. Goodbye My Love(情人再見)
1971	Lovely Stranger 可愛的陌生人	Hai Shen Record label Co, Ltd. 海山唱片	Track: 1. Lovely Stranger(可愛的陌生人); 2. When To Come Back(人兒幾時歸); 3. Colorful Love(彩色的愛); 4. When I Tell You About Love(告訴你愛的時候); 5. Mei Lan, I love You(梅蘭梅蘭我愛你); 6. Today And Tomorrow(今天和明天); 7. Declaration of love愛的宣言 8. My Affection(這就是我的情意); 9. Signs(空嘆息); 10. Love Fruit(愛情果); 11. Endless Love(相思未了情); 12. Wake Up and Dream Is Gone(酒醒夢已殘)
1972	The Blue Streetcar 藍色的街車	Hai Shen Record label Co, Ltd. 海山唱片	Track: 1. The Blue Streetcar(藍色的街車); 2. 風雨未了情; 3. Why Weeping? (為什麼要流淚); 4. Don't Mention the Past(過去不要再提起); 5. Drunk But Still Melancholia(喝完幾杯一樣愁); 6. Too Hard To Sing A Love Song(一曲相思情難了); 7. Let Flow Take You Away(流水把你帶走); 8. The Sentimental Flower(多情的小花); 9. Lovely Spring(可愛的春天); 10. Daffodils(水仙花); 11. How Much Love Is(愛情值多少); 12. Unforgettable First Love(忘不了初戀情人)
1973	See You in the Dream 夢裡再見	Hai Shen Record label Co, Ltd. 海山唱片	Track: 1. See You in the Dream(夢裡再見); 2. How Much Love You Gave?(你給我多少愛); 3. Drifting Clouds(白雲飄向誰); 4. How Interesting Life Is(人生多有趣); 5. Rain keeps Falling(細雨下不停); 6. My Love is Cold And Ice(我的愛人冷冰冰); 7. Dusk Without You(為什麼黃昏沒有你); 8. Handshake Happily(幸福的握手); 9. Love Is Like Running Water(愛情像流水); 10. Wish You The Best(祝你幸福); 11. Laughing Together(歡笑在一起); 12. Parallel Flowers(並蒂花)
1974	Love in Heart 愛在心裡	Hai Shen Record label Co, Ltd. 海山唱片	Track: 1. Why You Left Me?(為什麼離開我); 2. Love Road We Would Have Walked(走不完的愛情路); 3. You Are More Beautiful Than Peach Blossoms(你比桃花更美麗); 4. Blessings Under The Moon(月下祝福); 5. The Evening Breeze(陣陣晚風); 6. Singing For Happiness(為幸福歌唱); 7. Love in Heart(愛在心裡); 8. You Are My Best Partner(你是我的好伴侶); 9. Night Sky (夜空); 10. The Goddess of Spring(春的女神); 11. The Lady in the Dream(夢中姑娘); 12. Can't Let You Fall in Love With Him(不能讓你愛上他)
1975	Memories 雲煙	Kolin Label Record Co. 歌林唱片	Track: 1. You Should Cherish Him(你要珍惜他); 2. Memories(雲煙); 3. Beautiful Landscape(美麗的遠景); 4. Dream(夢); 5. Trust(信任); 6. I Belong to You Forever(我永遠屬於你); 7. You And Me(一個我一個你); 8. Wind From South(南風); 9. Confidant of the Wind And Rain(風雨知己); 10. Here Is A Good Place(這裡是個好地方); 11. Please Hold On(請你多待一會兒)
1976	We Both Know 你知我知	Hai Shen Record label Co, Ltd. 海山唱片	Track: 1. We Both Know(你知我知); 2. Send Love Under The Moon(月下寄情); 3. Bring Out The Sincerity(把真誠拿出來); 4. Love Poem(愛的詩篇); 5. See You Later(後會有期); 6. Comfort Of Friendship友情的安慰; 7. The Garment Of Love(愛的衣裳); 8. Two Worlds of A window(窗裡窗外); 9. Spring Is Back(春去春又來); 10. Breeze in The Rain(輕風細雨); 11. Love Evident(愛痕); 12. Mountain Living (山居樂)
