= Radim Jančura =

Czech businessman (born 1972)

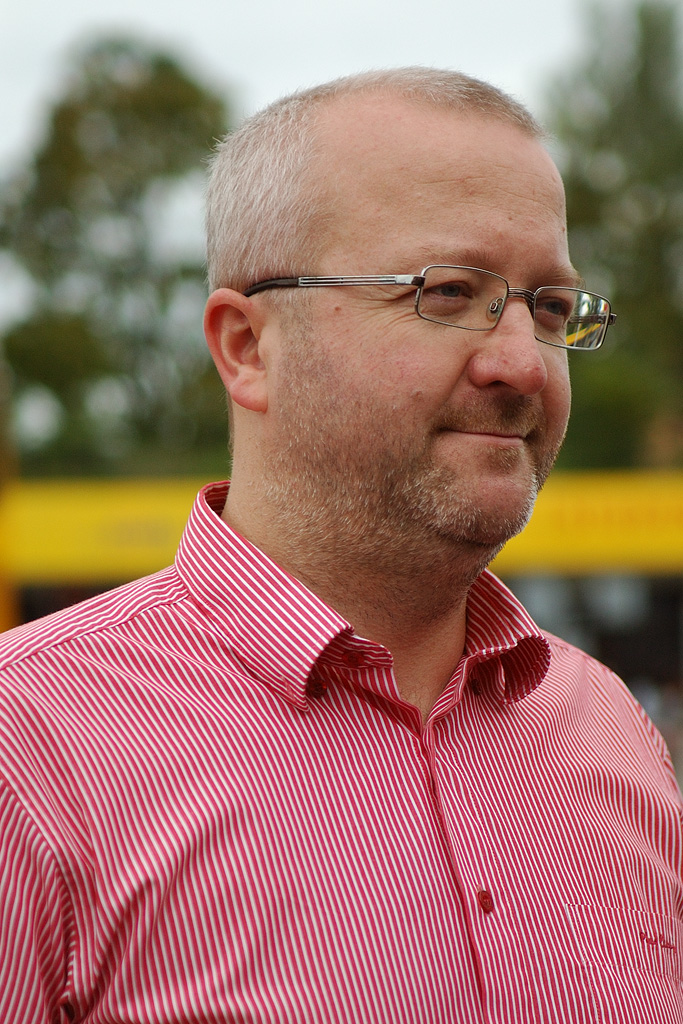
- Born: 12 January 1972 (age 54); Ostrava, Czechoslovakia
- Education: Brno University of Technology
- Occupation: businessman
- Known for: Student Agency; RegioJet

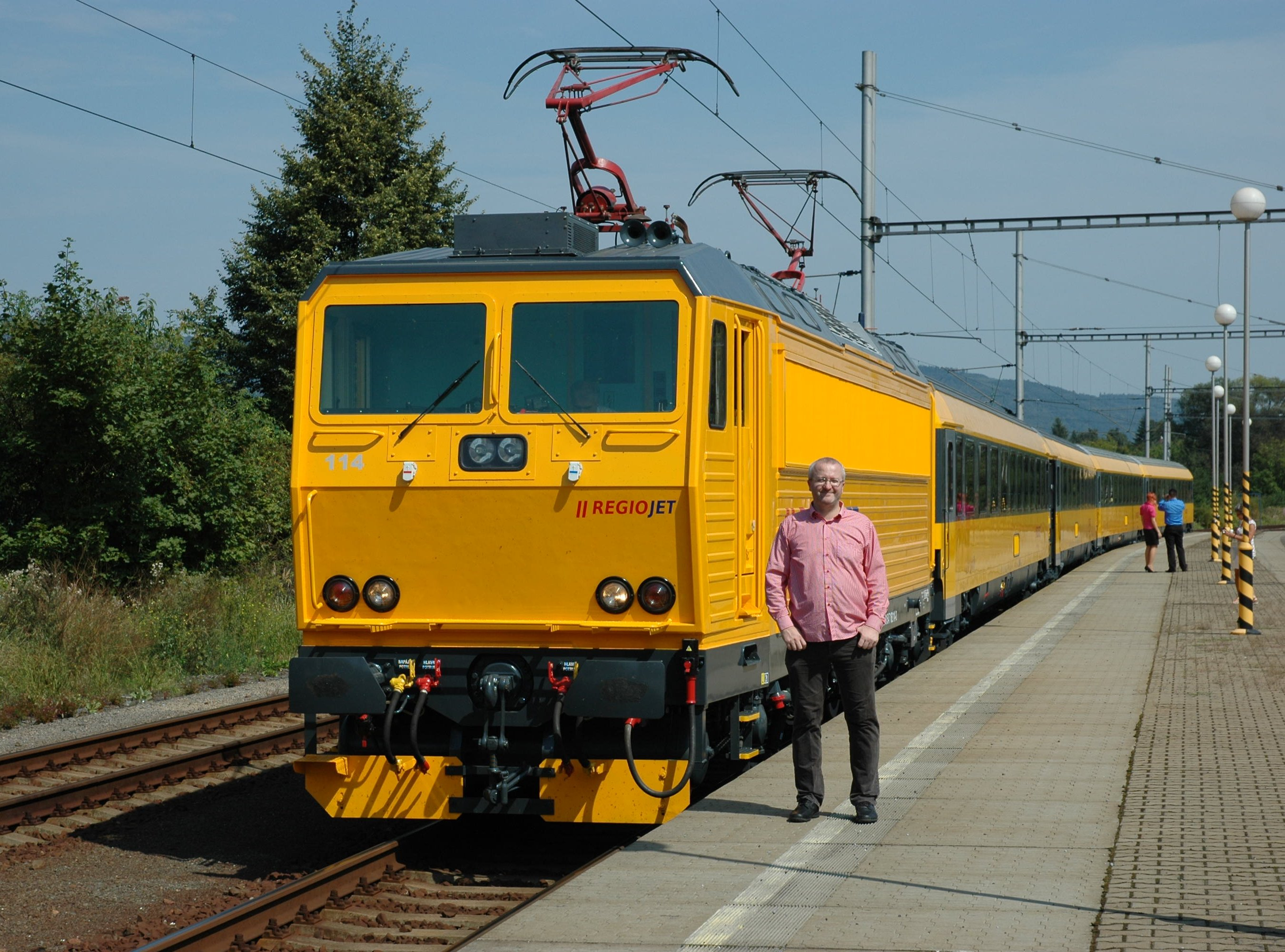
Radim Jančura with RegioJet train

Radim Jančura (born 12 January 1972 in Ostrava) is a Czech businessman. He is the founder, sole owner and managing director of Student Agency and a board member of its subsidiary RegioJet.

In the early 1990s Radim Jančura graduated from Brno University of Technology and was also an exchange student in London. After two months he returned to Brno and set up an au pair agency (Student Agency) working with British agencies to send Czechs and Slovaks to Britain. Student Agency is one of the most popular transport companies in the Czech Republic today.

Jančura was named Czech Entrepreneur of the Year in 2005 by Ernst and Young.
