= Prajogo Pangestu =

Indonesian business magnate, investor and philanthropist (born 1944)

- Born: Phang Djoen Phen 彭雲鵬; 13 May 1944 (age 82); Bengkayang, Japanese-occupied Dutch East Indies
- Occupation: Businessman
- Known for: Founder of Barito Pacific
- Spouse: Herlina Tjandinegara
- Children: Agus Salim Pangestu; Nancy Pangestu; Baritono Pangestu

Prajogo Pangestu, born Phang Djoen Phen (Chinese: 彭雲鵬; Pe̍h-ōe-jī: Phênn Hûn Phîng; born 13 May 1944), is an Indonesian billionaire, business magnate, investor, and philanthropist. He is the founder of the Indonesian conglomerate Barito Pacific Group, which engages in forestry, plantations, oil and gas, coal, gold mining, and geothermal energy. With a net worth of US$43.41 billion, he is the wealthiest person in Southeast Asia.

== Early life ==
Pangestu was born on 13 May 1944, in Bengkayang, West Kalimantan, into a Hakka family from Guangdong, China. He attended Chinese schools in Indonesia and moved to Jakarta in 1965. In 1970, he joined Burhan Uray's timber company Djajanti Group and became the general manager of PT Nusantara in 1976. He left Djajanti in 1977 to start his own business.

== Business career ==
Prajogo's company PT Barito Pacific Timber Tbk was the largest listed company on the Jakarta Stock Exchange in 1993. In 2007, the company rebranded to reflect its diversified operations.

In addition to PT Barito Pacific Tbk, which manages Indonesia's largest petrochemical producer, PT Chandra Asri Pacific Tbk, he controls Barito Renewables, which owns Star Energy Geothermal, a leading geothermal company. Chandra Asri, Barito Renewables, and Star Energy are the core businesses of Barito Pacific.

In March 2022, it was announced that Green Era, a Singapore-based company controlled by Prajogo, acquired 33.33% of Star Energy from Thailand’s BCPG for $440 million, giving him full control of Star Energy.
