= Burhan Uray =

Chinese-Indonesian entrepreneur and philanthropist (1931–2018)

Dato' Sri Burhan Uray (13 November 1931 – 2 October 2018), also known as Huang Shuang'an (Chinese: 黄双安) in Mandarin Chinese and Bong Swan An or Bong Sun On in Eastern Min, was a Chinese-Indonesian entrepreneur and philanthropist, known as the "Timber King" of Indonesia. Born into a poor family in Fujian, China, he moved to Sarawak in childhood and then to Indonesia, where he founded the Djajanti Group and turned it into the second largest timber company in the country. He later diversified into other businesses including fishery.

== Biography ==
Uray was born Huang Shuang'an on 13 November 1931, into a poor family in Minqing County, Fujian, China. He moved to Sibu, Sarawak (now in Malaysia) with his parents at the age of six. Having received little education, he worked as a logger in his youth.

Uray moved to Indonesia in 1956, where he worked as a rubber tapper before starting his own timber company. He established good relations with the government and acquired logging concessions and greatly expanded his business in the 1960s. Prajogo Pangestu, who later became another timber tycoon, had his start in the business as an employee of Uray.

In 1976, Djajanti opened PT Nusantara, a woodworking business near Surabaya, and Indonesian President Suharto personally officiated the opening. Djajanti acquired concessions in Central Kalimantan, East Kalimantan, and Irian Jaya, totalling 4,000,000 hectares (9,900,000 acres). The group manufactures timber products which are exported to many Asian countries as well as to other continents. Uray became known as "the timber king" of Indonesia. As of 2012, the Djajanti Group is Indonesia's second largest timber company.

Uray later diversified into other businesses. In 1994, Uray sold 31.5% of Djajanti to Malaysia's Karamat Tin Dredging Company, in exchange of a 25% share of Karamat. In 1994, Djajanti started a fishery megaproject worth 1.5 trillion rupiah.

Uray made many charitable contributions. He set up a fund in 1982 to help students in Sibu, and donated 1.5 million ringgit in 1992 to construct the Sarawak Liing Hung Wong Clan Association building. He also made donations to his hometown Minqing to help its development.

== Personal life ==
Burhan Uray married twice. He had four sons with his first wife, and all were educated abroad and worked in his businesses. In September 1977, he married Bai Jia-li, a Taiwanese television presenter. In 2013, Pai published Uray's biography in Chinese, which was published in English in 2016 under the title Love in the Forest with Burhan Uray.

== Illnesses and death ==
According to the biography written by his wife, Uray was diagnosed with colon cancer in 1992 and had two operations in Singapore. In 2003, he received an operation in the United States for liver cancer. In 2007, he had a stroke while travelling in Japan.

Uray died on 2 October 2018 in New York, aged 86. He was buried at Nirvana Memorial Park in Sibu, Malaysia on 7 October.
