= MOD Technology =

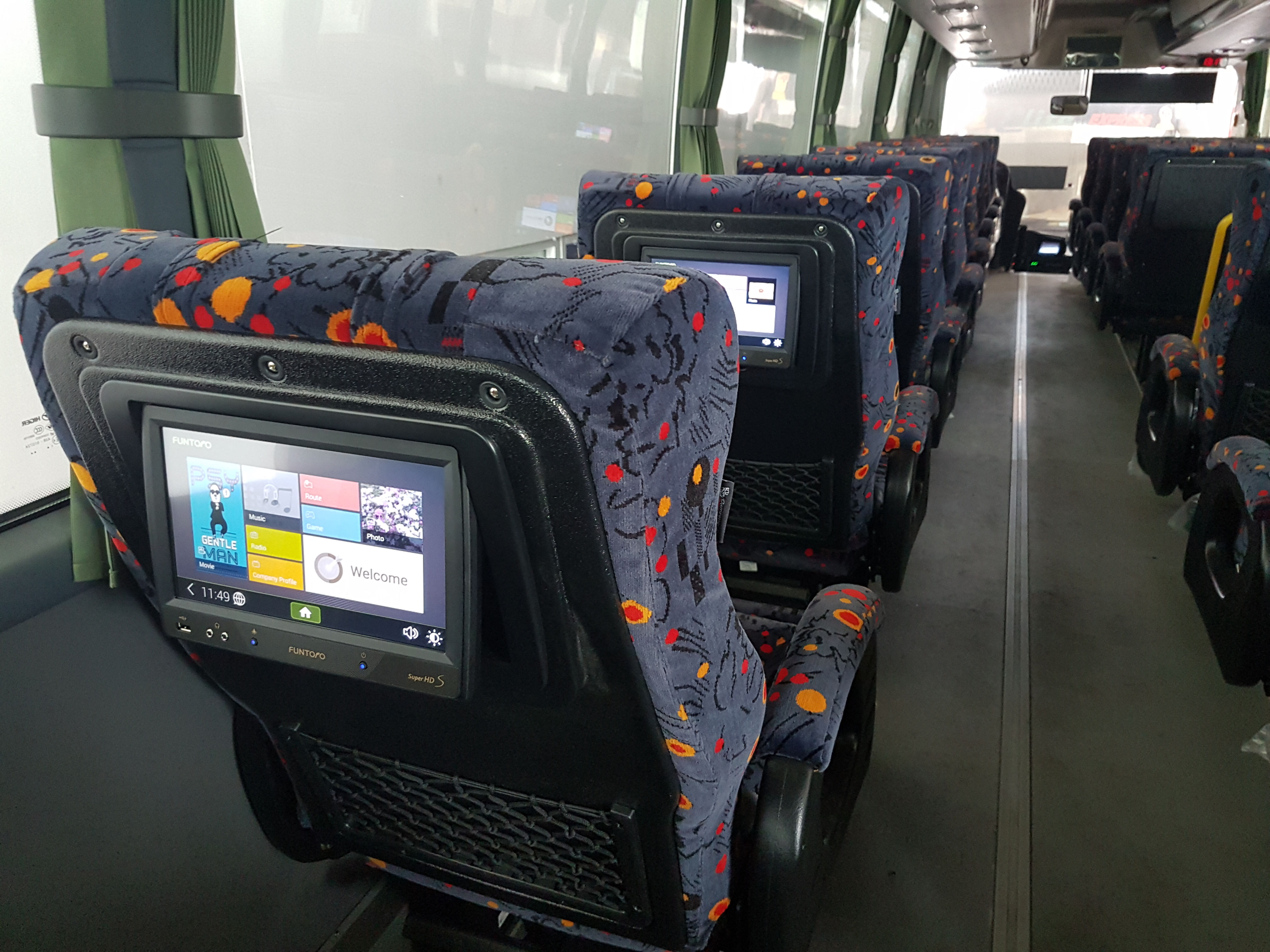
FUNTORO MOD System in Scania Bus

MOD (Media on Demand) Technology is an advanced infotainment technology designed and licensed by FUNTORO. When it was first introduced in 2008, the technology was one of the most innovative and multifunctional system in the automotive industry. Currently, it is widely applied in railway, automotive & commercial industries with an aim to provide infotainment services through interactive monitors embedded in seatback or armrest.

Apart from VOD (Video on Demand), MOD Technology is a more advanced and integrated platform that combines entertainment, real-time information, value-added services, advertising system, attractions guidance, shopping & ordering service, network connectivity and Cloud management.

MOD Technology can be implemented in coach bus, city bus, sightseeing bus, sleeper bus, railways, stadium, hotels and others.

== See also ==
- In vehicle infotainment
