= Student Agency =

Czech travel agency

- Company type: Private (100%)
- Industry: Transport company
- Founded: Brno (1996)
- Headquarters: Brno, Czech Republic
- Key people: Radim Jančura
- Revenue: 2,804,723,000 Czech koruna (2016)
- Operating income: 144,169,000 Czech koruna (2016)
- Net income: 126,131,000 Czech koruna (2016)
- Total assets: 1,758,526,000 Czech koruna (2016)
- Number of employees: 1,378 (2016)
- Subsidiaries: RegioJet
- Website: Official website

Student Agency is a Czech travel agency whose main focuses are on au-pair programmes, resale of airline tickets, bus and rail transport. Its headquarters are in Brno, Czech Republic. Despite the company's name, their services are not sold exclusively to students. Student Agency is the sole owner of RegioJet, which operates bus and rail transport across Czechia, Slovakia and Poland.

The company was founded by Radim Jančura, a graduate of the Brno University of Technology. Since its registration in 1996, Jančura has remained CEO and is the sole owner.

== History ==
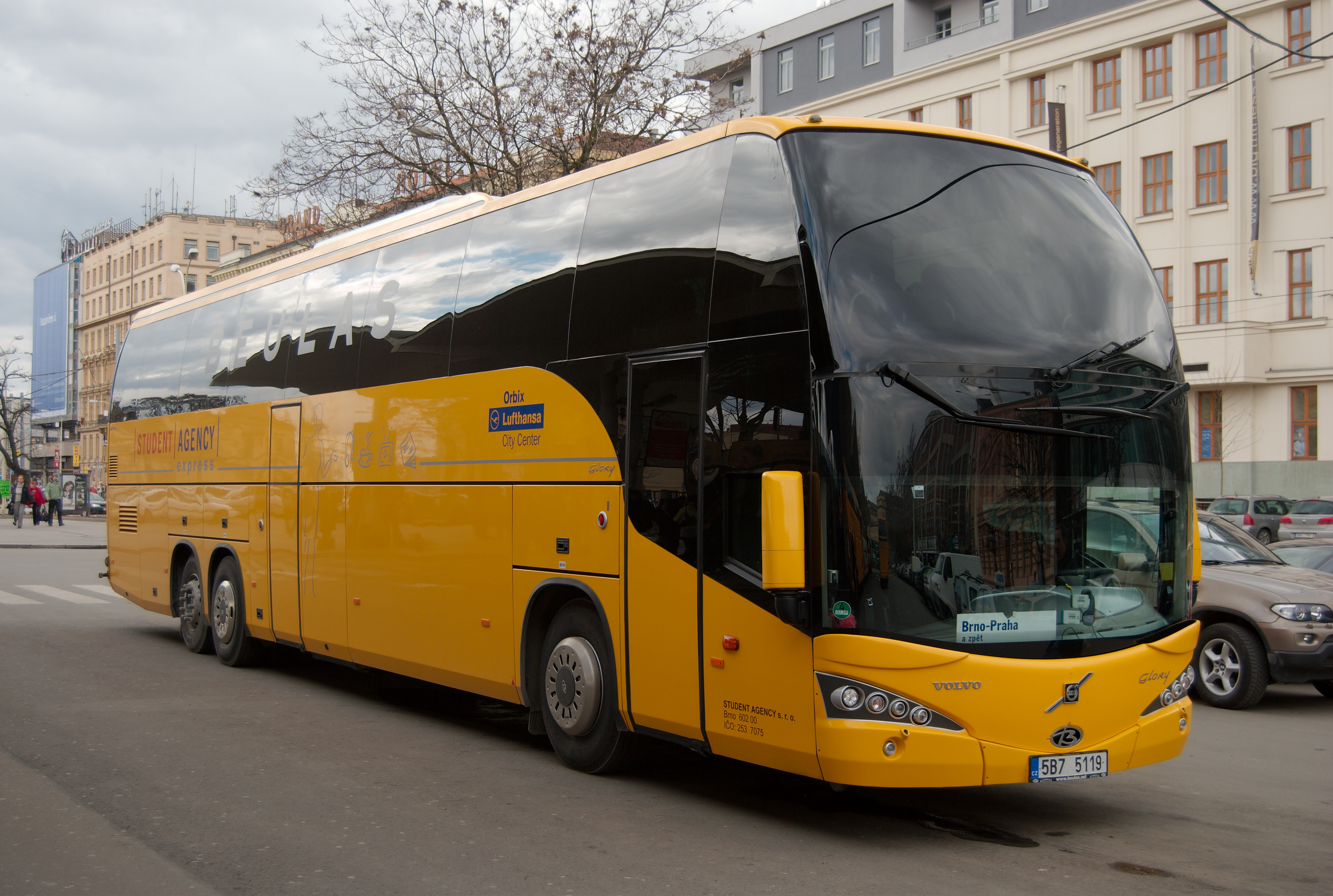
Student Agency Bus

Initially the company dealt with mediating au-pair stays for students from the Czech Republic, later extending its sphere of activities to include:

- mediating language study programmes abroad (1996)
- mediating work programmes (1996)
- regular domestic bus transport (2004)
- sale of air tickets (2000)
- sale of tours and holidays (2010)

Within the transport field, Student Agency operated international bus transport from the start and since 2004 the company operated regular domestic lines.

On 24 February 2006, Student Agency was recognised in the TTG Travel Awards of 2005 as “Best flight (IATA) agency in the Czech Republic” and “Best bus transporter”. In the same year, CEO Jančura expressed in several interviews his intention to extend Student Agency's bus transport within 3 years and to also become a provider of rail.

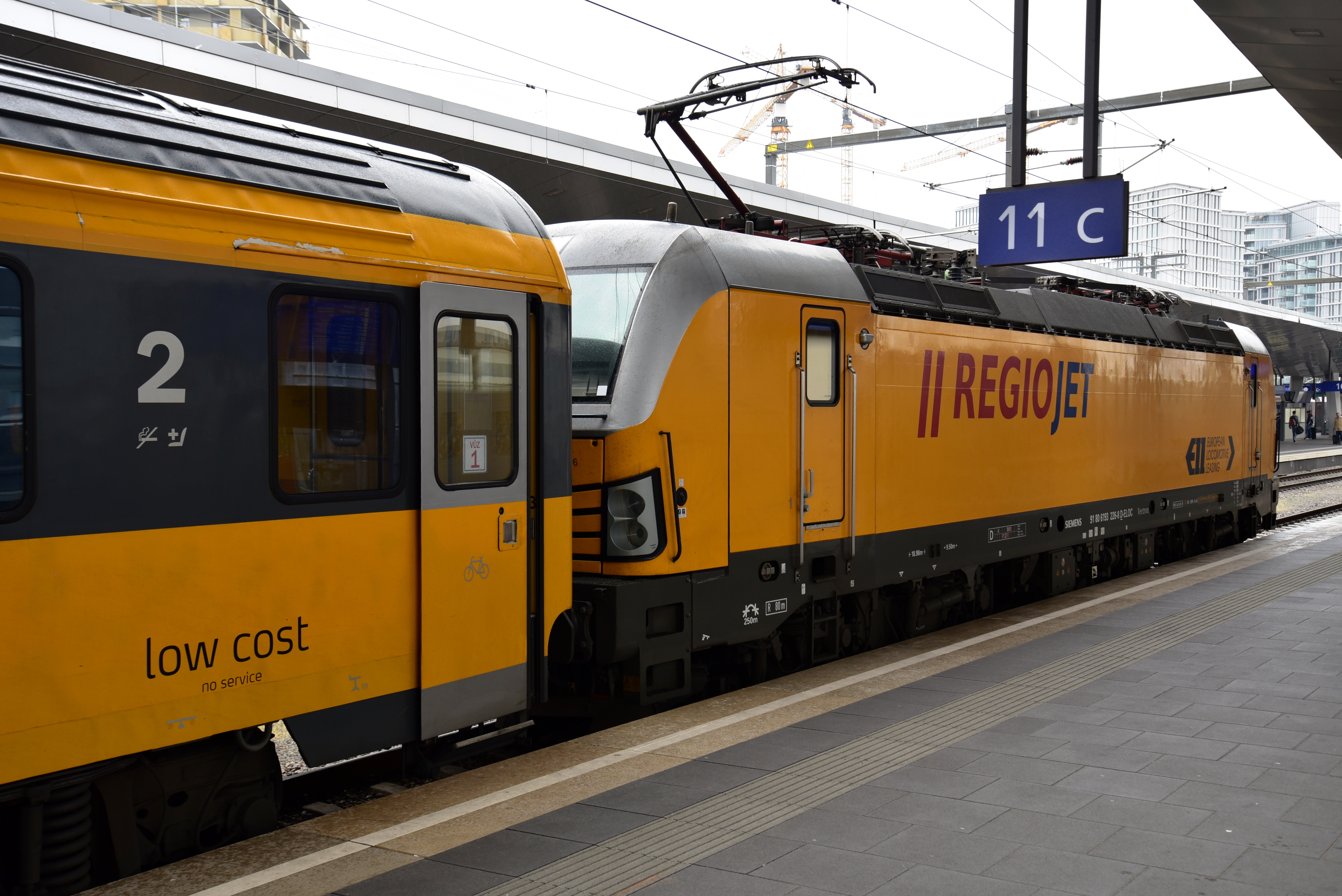
RegioJet train at Wien Hauptbahnhof

The company RegioJet a.s. was incorporated in the Companies Register on 20 March 2009 with the subject of enterprise “production, business and services not stated in attachments 1 to 3 of the Trade Licensing Act” and on 6 October 2009 the subject of activity “operator of railway and railway transport” was registered. RegioJet is a private railway operator which competes with state-owned Czech and Slovak railways. They have been given the right to operate on Czech tracks and are one of the service providers on the Ostrava-Prague connection. They also offer train services in Slovakia and operate routes to other European cities, such as Vienna.

A sister company of the same name, RegioJet a.s., with its registered office in Bratislava was established in 2010 and is nowadays an operator of rail and bus transport in Slovakia.

From 2016, bus transport was included under the RegioJet brand. The company operates lines connecting Prague with Ostrava, Vienna (both via Brno), Plzeň, Liberec and Hradec Králové. The most frequent is the Prague–Brno line with round the clock time schedule. There are also many less frequent international lines to: London, Amsterdam, Eindhoven, Hamburg, Munich, Berlin, Stuttgart, Dresden, Paris, Košice, Budapest, Rome, Naples, Venice, Zürich, Bern, Geneva, Oslo and some other destinations.

== Taxi ==
In April 2013, Student Agency acquired taxi company Tick Tack with the aim of operating a taxi service aimed at wealthier and corporate clients. Jančura announced that the new company should become number one in the taxi service in Prague within a year, purchase 1,000 new Audi A6 and BMW GT cars with an average age of up to 1 year, and improve the bad name of the Prague taxi service. Trial operation was supposed to start on July 15, 2013 and full operation after the summer holidays. The company was sold to competitor "Taxi Prague" in February 2018 due to financial losses.

== Finances ==
At the end of 2004 Student Agency had 368 employees, the annual turnover totalled CZK 1.5 bn, and the operating profit amounted to CZK 9m. The company's registered capital is only CZK 1m.

In the first half of 2008, Student Agency announced operating profit of CZK 2.1 bn and employed 950 people.

Selected financial results of Student Agency, s.r.o.
million CZK	2000	2001	2002	2003	2004	2005	2006	2007	2008	2009
Operating revenues	148	307	753	901	1,266	1,471	2,108	2,755	3,525	2,915
Operating profit	(0)	(-1)	5	5	7	12	13	19	21	112
Net profit after tax	0	1	1	2	3	7	7	0	13	76
Assets	16	35	72	98	99	140	220	413	379	403
Equity	0	1	3	5	7	14	19	17	29	100
