= FUNTORO =

Taiwanese telematics company

Funtoro Inc.
- Industry: Automotive & Commercial Electronics
- Founded: 2008
- Headquarters: New Taipei, Taiwan
- Area served: Worldwide
- Key people: Scott Chen, Managing Director
- Products: Telematics; Fleet management Cloud management Digital advertising products Infotainment products MOD Technology; Railway infotainment systems Sightseeing products Venue products Hospitality products
- Parent: MSI
- Website: www.funtoro.com

Funtoro is a Micro-Star International subsidiary that provides telematics and infotainment solutions for commercial vehicles and venues. It designs, develops and supplies fleet management services, a cloud management platform, digital advertisement solutions, infotainment products, stadium & arena products and hospitality products to commercial sectors, public transportation and automotive industries. An estimated 1,000,000+ terminals across 38+ countries run the system on commercial vehicles, railway, stadium and other venues. Its clients include Mercedes Benz, MAN, Scania and IRIZAR.

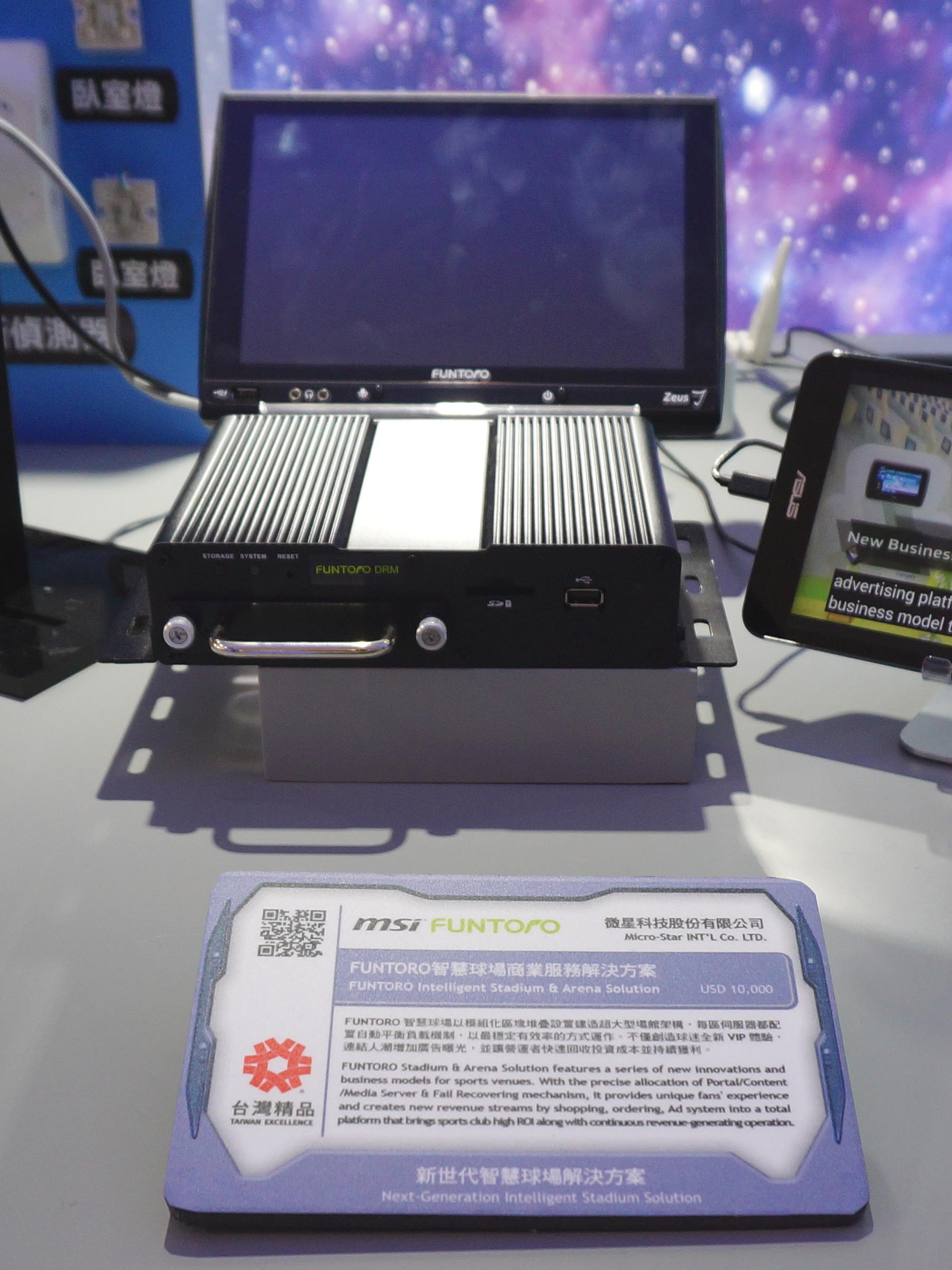
Funtoro stadium media management system

== History ==
- 2008 -FUNTORO was founded. It was initially focused on Automotive Electronics’ research, development and software integration. After becoming part of MSI (Micro-Star International) Group, FUNTORO acquired experience and resources of embedded system and vehicle Telematics, resulting in a product-line expansion. In the same year FUNTORO officially launched Media on Demand products to provide passengers with multimedia entertainment and information for intercity long-distance buses.
- 2009 -FUNTORO expanded its business territory to Europe, UAE, Southeast Asia and obtained highest market share in Turkey and Latin America. In the same year, FUNTORO also released Telematics products for commercial vehicles providing functions like fleet management, safety monitoring, vehicle information, driver behavior and Cloud management platform for fleet managers.
- 2010 - FUNTORO MOD products entered the intercity bus market in Japan and started to cooperate with the biggest coach bus body builder in China- Yutong. In the same year, equipped with FUNTORO Telematics products, a new generation of citybus in Taichung City makes commuters' daily life more convenient and informative.
- 2011- started a cooperation with Autosound – the leading provider of bus and coach multimedia systems in United Kingdom.
- 2012 - in cooperation with municipal government of Brazil, establishes a new series of city buses for its public transportation infrastructure in Rio de Janeiro. In the same year, FUNTORO cooperates with top 3 bus operators in Mexico – Primera Plus, Transpais and Omnibus de México.
- 2013 - partners with two of the biggest bus fleet in Latin America – Cruz del Sur and Tur-bus to equip buses traveling between all major cities in Peru, Chile and Colombia with FUNTORO Infotainment products. Meanwhile, Lux Express and Student Agency, biggest international coach operators in the Baltic region & Czech Republic, launched their new luxury buses with FUNTORO solution.
- 2013 - FUNTORO Railway Infotainment products started operation on railway routes in Central and Eastern Europe.
- 2014 - Sightseeing bus “SKYBUS” in Kyoto, Hop-on Hop-off Sightseeing bus in Shanghai, Vienna Sightseeing Tram "Ring Tram" implement FUNTORO products. Taiwan Taxi implements FUNTORO Smart AD products, generating additional advertising revenue in the amount of multi-millions US dollars per year.
- 2015 - Vodafone Park stadium in Istanbul, Turkey implemented FUNTORO Stadium & Arena products as a part of its modernization project. The project was awarded "Project of the Year Award at The Stadium Business Design & Development Summit" in 2017. Launched a new generation of Telematics products for Heavy duty trucks, coaches & buses.
- 2016 - Sombat Tour in Thailand and Alsa, the biggest bus operators in Spain, implement FUNTORO Infotainment solution in their first-class coach buses.
- 2016 - officially became a subsidiary-brand of MSI. Meanwhile, FUNTORO Hospitality products experience a steady growth in Hotel industry in Southeast Asia & Europe
- 2017 - started a cooperation with MAN, providing Telematics products along with a Cloud management platform for their Heavy duty trucks. Conducted a railway modernization project with Government of India
