= Montafon =

Valley in Vorarlberg, Austria

Coordinates: 47.08°N 9.90°E

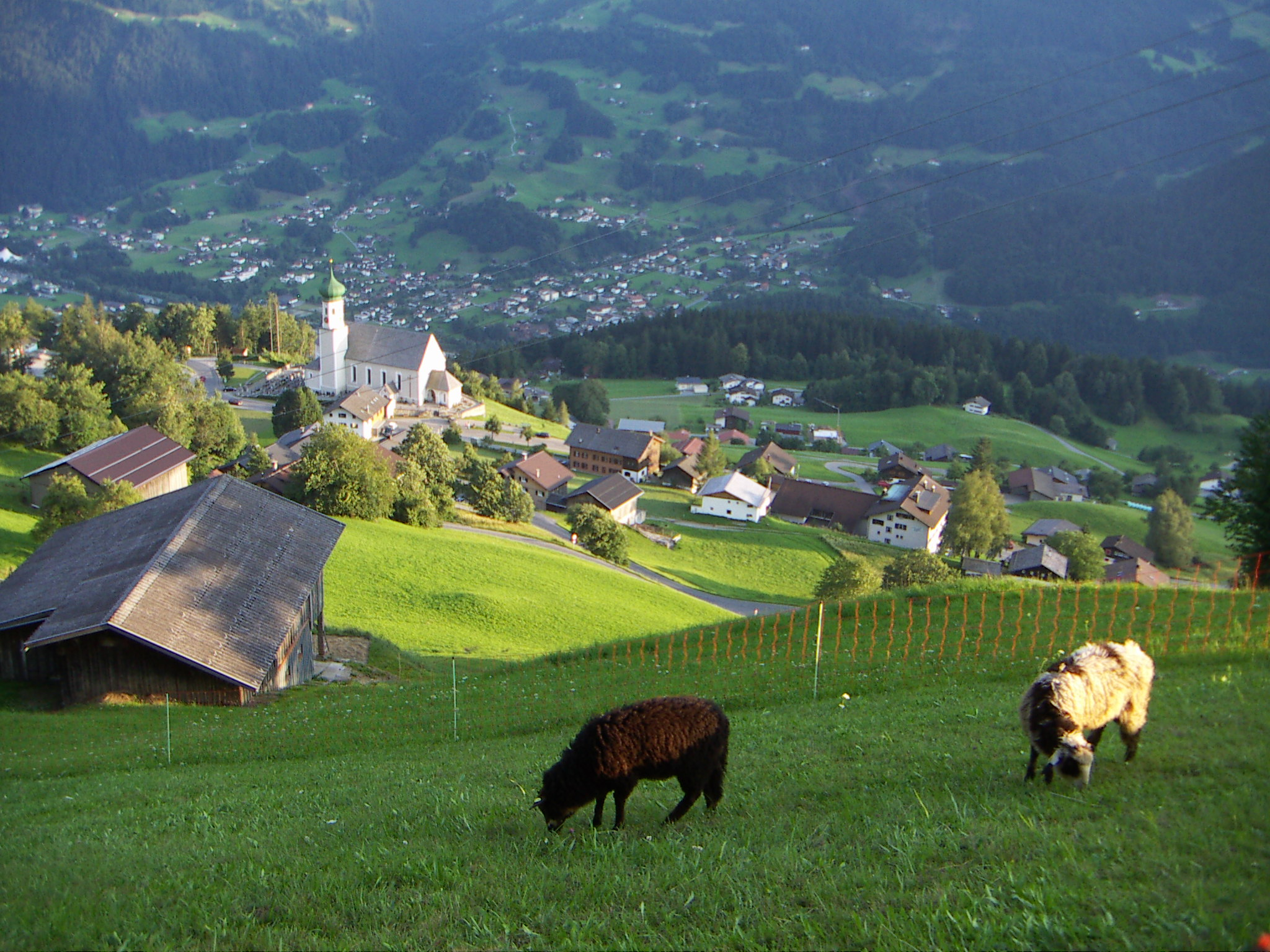
Montafon stone sheep in Bartholomäberg in the Montafon valley (2008)

Montafon (German: [mɔntaˈfoːn] in local dialect: "Muntafu") is a 39-kilometer (24 mi) long valley in the westernmost Austrian federal state of Vorarlberg.

It is traversed by the river Ill (Vorarlberg) and extends from the city of Bludenz and the Verwall Alps in the north, to the Silvretta and Rätikon mountain range in the south. Piz Buin, at 3,312 meters, is the highest peak within the Silvretta mountain range and the highest peak in Vorarlberg. The Montafon region has a population of 16,421^{(2021)}.

== Geography ==
Map with municipalities in Vorarlberg belonging to Montafon

The Montafon is an association of ten communities ("Stand Montafon"), all of which belong to the Bludenz district. The main town is Schruns. Regional tourism is marketed by the Tourist Association Montafon, run by the municipalities, the Vorarlberger Illwerke and the regional mountain cableways.

The municipalities:

- Bartholomäberg (1,100 m; 3,600 ft)
- Gaschurn (1,000 m; 3,300 ft)
- Lorüns (583 m; 1,913 ft)
- St. Anton im Montafon (650 m; 2,130 ft)
- Sankt Gallenkirch (900 m; 3,000 ft)
- Schruns (700 m; 2,300 ft)
- Silbertal (890 m; 2,920 ft)
- Stallehr (600 m; 2,000 ft)
- Tschagguns (700 m; 2,300 ft)
- Vandans (660 m; 2,170 ft)

The route from Bludenz into the valley: The state road B188 leads past an old cement plant and through the town of Lorüns. Then one drives through the Alma woods and past the Tränabächle (Brook of Tears). The valley unfolds its full splendor beginning at St. Anton (in the local dialect: "Santatöni") on the left, with Vens and Vandans on the right. St. Anton should not be confused with the more well-known ski resort of St. Anton am Arlberg.

Passing on to Rodund the main electrohydric plant of the Vorarlberger Illwerke comes into view. Continue on through Gantschier and Kaltenbrunnen to Schruns and Tschagguns (in the local dialect: "Schru und Tschaggu"). Above Schruns is the mountain town of Bartholomäberg, with its outlying areas Jetzmunt and Lutt overlooking St. Anton, and its southeastern precincts Kristberg and Innerberg overlooking the Silbertal Valley. This valley stretches southeast from Schruns towards the Arlberg mountain range, passing the outpost of the Fellamendli. The hamlet of Latschau, with its hydroelectric power station and the main base of the Golm ski resort, projecting up over Tschagguns, and opposite Bartholomäberg.

From Schruns and Tschagguns form the midpoint of the Montafon; this divides the outer valley ("Außerfratte") from the inner valley ("Innerfratte"). Continuing up to St. Gallenkirch, the road branches off at Galgenul towards Gargellen, another rugged branch valley that ends at the ski resort of Gargellen. Continuing up the main Montafon valley, the road passes through Gortipohl and on to Gaschurn (in the local dialect: "Gaschorra"), then to Partenen. Here the road snakes up to the Silvretta mountain pass.

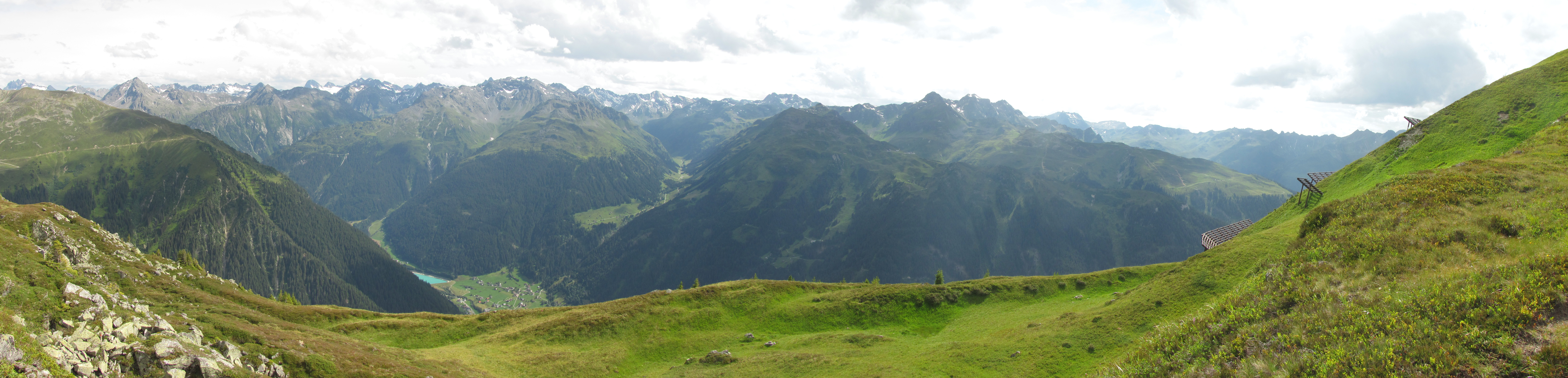
Panorama from Grappeskopf (2,205 m; 7,234 ft) near Gortipohl, Montafon

== Economy ==
The economy in the Montafon is dominated by a mixture of traditional rural activities like forestry, hydroelectric energy production, agricultural products, as well as tourism-related services and products.

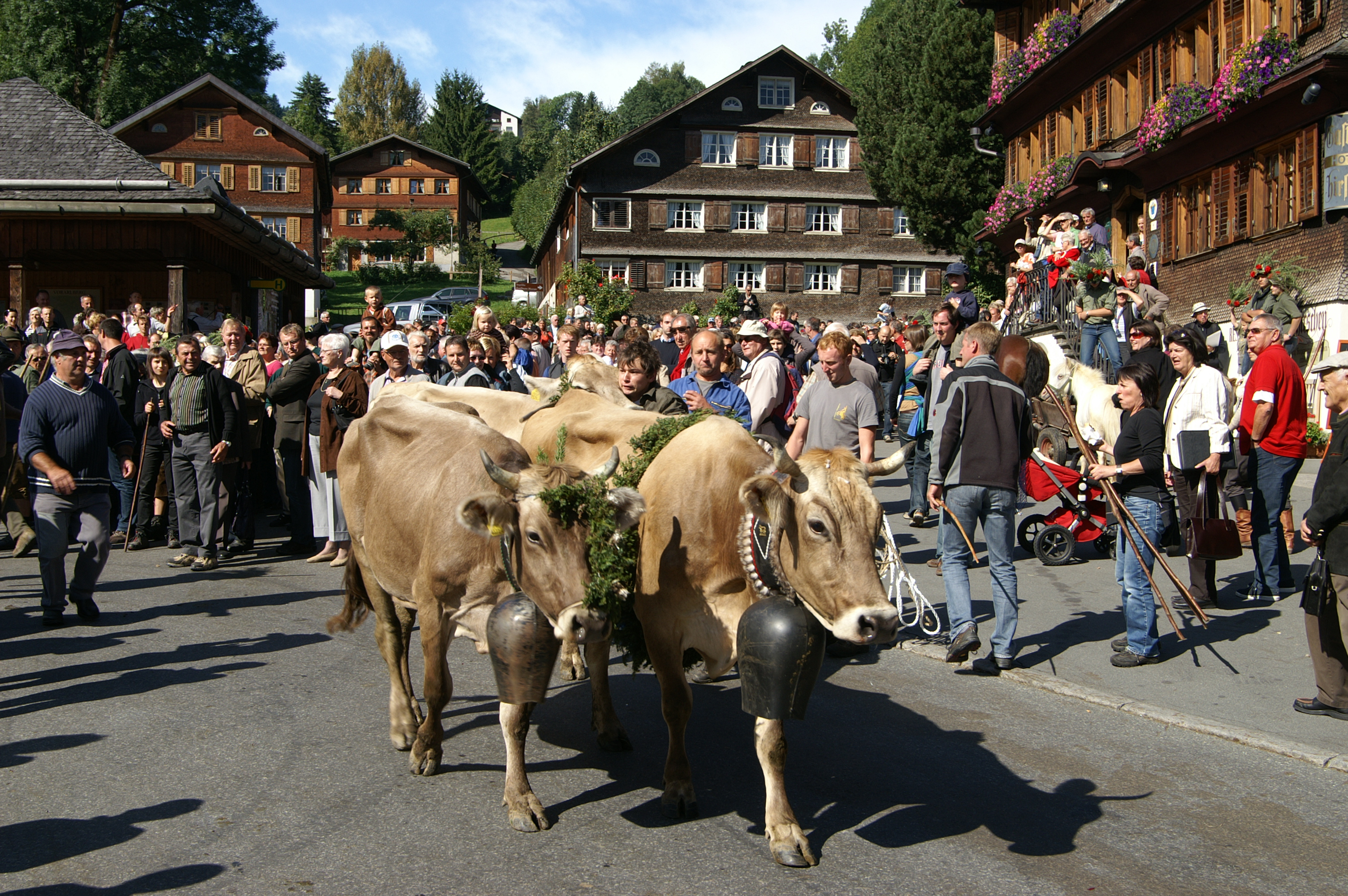
Festive "Almabtrieb" parade in September

=== Agriculture and Farming ===
Farming and agriculture are part of traditional Alpine transhumance. This is a three-phase seasonal droving of grazing livestock between the valleys in winter and the high mountain pastures in summer, ensuring a sufficient food supply for the cattle throughout the year. While tourism and other industries contribute more to the economy, seasonal migration to high pastures is still an important economic factor for parts of the population. In the autumn, if no animals have died and there have not been any accidents up in the mountains, the farmers decorate the cattle and bring them down from the mountain pastures in a festive parade, a highlight of regional culture.

=== Tourism ===
==== Sports ====
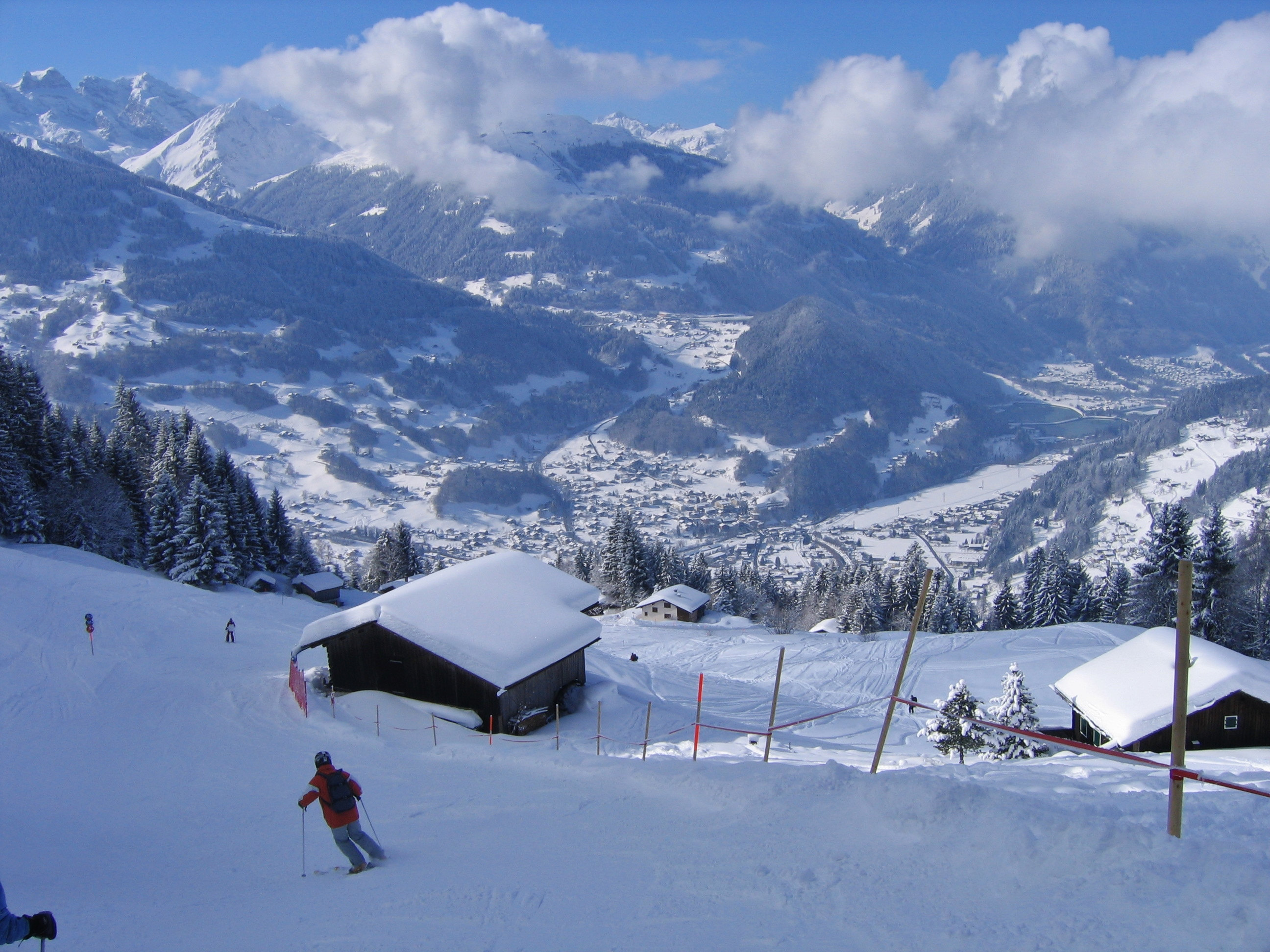
The Silvretta-Montafon ski area

Tourism plays a vital role and the Montafon is well-known for its skiing, hiking, and mountain biking. The Silvretta high alpine road (German: Hochalpenstraße) gives access to remote ski areas that are located altitudes of 650 to 1,430 meters (2,130 to 4,690 ft). The construction of the Montafon Railway in 1905 also helped develop the seasonal tourist industries.

There are five ski regions: Silvretta Montafon, Golm, Gargellen, Silbertal-Kristberg and Silvretta-Bielerhöhe, with a total of 60 ski lifts and 225 kilometers (140 mi) of ski slopes in the region. Freeriding is a popular sport and there are various fun parks with half-pipes. For cross-country skiing there are 121 kilometers (75 mi) of classic routes, as well as 33 kilometers (21 mi) of skating-routes.

Ski mountaineering has become more and more popular and can be pursued on every mountain in the Montafon.

During the summers and autumns the vast hiking trails along all of the mountain ranges are very popular, among locals and tourists alike. There are even trails that can be accessed via pushchairs ("Muntafuner Gagla Weg“). Nine of the ski lifts are also open during the summer and autumn seasons and allow for quick and convenient ascents or descents in the mountains. All hiking and biking trails are well-marked. Many areas are protected and biking is not always allowed. 26 alpine huts are open during the summer, and special buses for hikers operate in the area.

Mountain hiking and climbing are possible on a great variety of trails, with a broad range of difficulties. For beginners, there are eight climbing parks and 15 fixed rope routes.

There are also two 9-hole golf courses in Tschagguns and in Partenen.

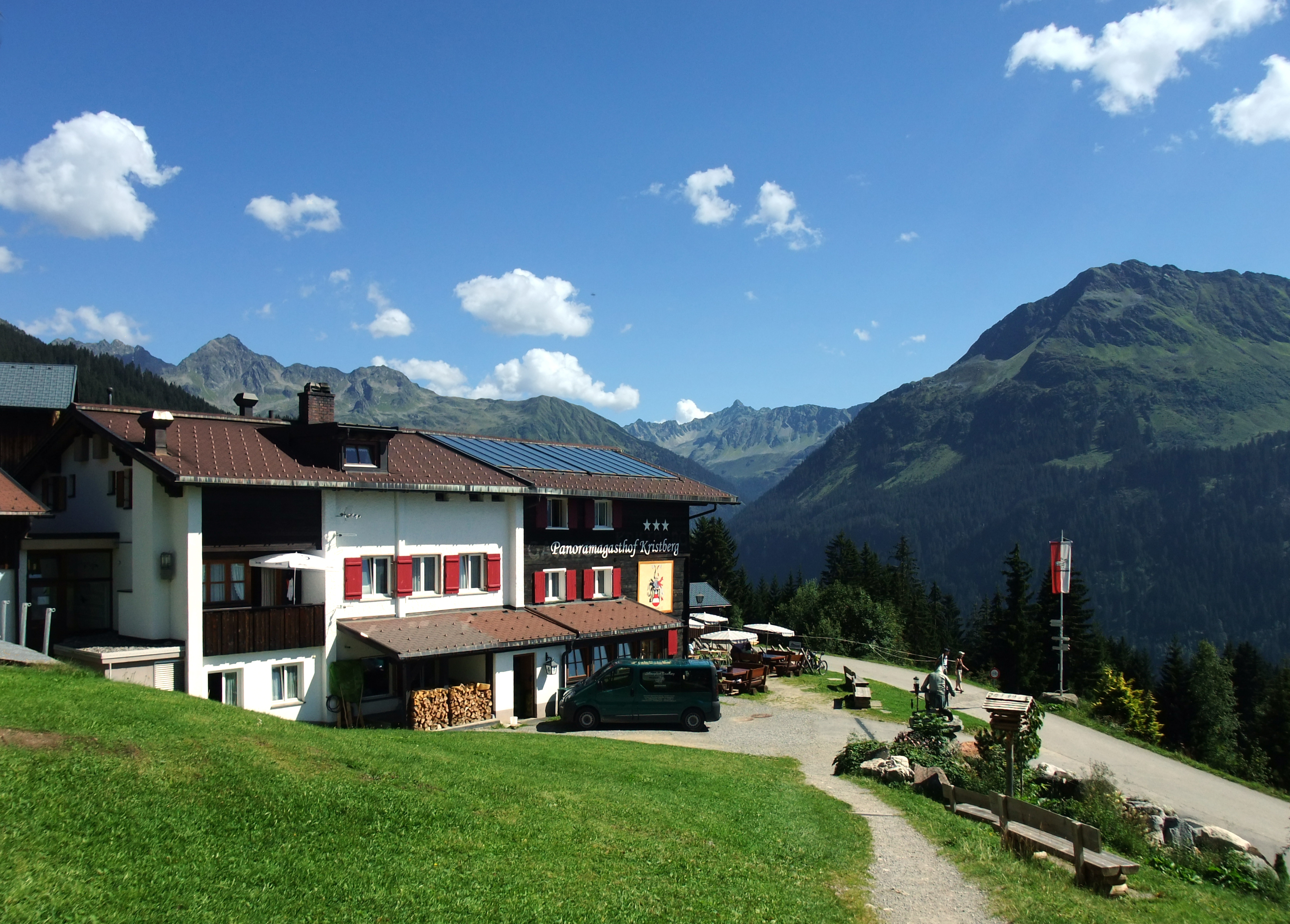
The Panoramagasthof Kristberg is one of the locations of the Montafoner Resonanzen music festival.

==== Annual events ====
Montafoner Resonanzen is a music festival consisting of a series of events in the Montafon region. It is held annually on weekends in August and September. Each weekend is dedicated to another genre (classical, jazz, Austrian folk musik, organ, cross-over). The locations vary each year. Guests may combine hiking and eating out with the concerts, considering the musical performances are held at extraordinary locations like the Tübinger Hütte at 2,191 m (7,188 ft) (Gaschurn) or the Panoramagasthof Kristberg.

== Sports ==
In the 2012/13 season, the first SBX World Cup Montafon was held as part of the FIS Snowboard World Cup. The World Cup takes place annually in December, with races carried out in the Silvretta Montafon ski area, starting below the Hochjoch summit and finishing near the cable car's mountain station. The difference in altitude between start and finish is around 200 meters (660 ft). During the World Cup, visitors can watch the snowboarders and skiers during the day time and enjoy concerts in Schruns in the nighttime.

The Montafon-Arlberg Marathon is a mountain marathon taking place since 2003. It encomprises 42,195 meters (138,435 ft) and 1,500 meters (4,900 ft) in altitude in two federal states (Vorarlberg and Tyrol).

== Culture ==
=== Customs and Traditions ===
Alpine Transhumance plays a vital role in traditional Alpine culture, just as do Yodeling, Alphorn, Schwingen, and cheese production (i. e. Alpkäse, Bergkäse).

=== Tracht ===
The Montafon festive costume for women consists of a black dress (Juppa), whose bodice (Miadr) is laced at the front. An apron (Schoß) in pastel colors is tied over it. The embroidery is particularly valuable on this costume: the "Brosttuach" is tied in the front of the bodice (ibresa), the apron straps (Schoßbänder) are tied over the apron. Nowadays, the "Libli" (actually part of the younger girls' costume) is mainly worn by dance groups instead of outerwear. In this case, a white blouse is also part of the costume. The picture is rounded off by a red petticoat, red stockings, shoes with buckles and a bow tied around the neck.

The most striking feature of the Montafon festive costume is the embroidery. This consists of two or more parts, depending on the occasion and the outer clothing of the costume. All embroidery is handmade, embroidered with silk on black velvet. A skilled embroiderer needs around 500 working hours to produce a complete embroidery.

Today, the traditional garment is still being manufactured at the Juppenwerkstatt Riefensberg.

==== Outer wear ====
- Glöggli-Tschopa: The curly cut Glögglitschopa, so named after the red or green lined frill on the back, has long, narrow sleeves with lapels made of embroidered silk atlas. A characteristic of a well-fitting Glögglitschopa is the Benkli, a fold running from the middle of the breast cloth to the Glöggli.
- Schlutta: The Schlutta, originally the warden chopa, is a brocade jacket. The collar has a delicate white tip.

==== Headpieces ====
- Pelzkappa: a heavy otter skin hat
- Mäßli: a headgear with the shape of a cylinder that widens upwards without a brim
- Sanderhut: The sander hat is a headgear introduced around 1900 for the Montafon costume.
- Schäppel: a silver or gold crown worn by young girls
Montafoner Tracht

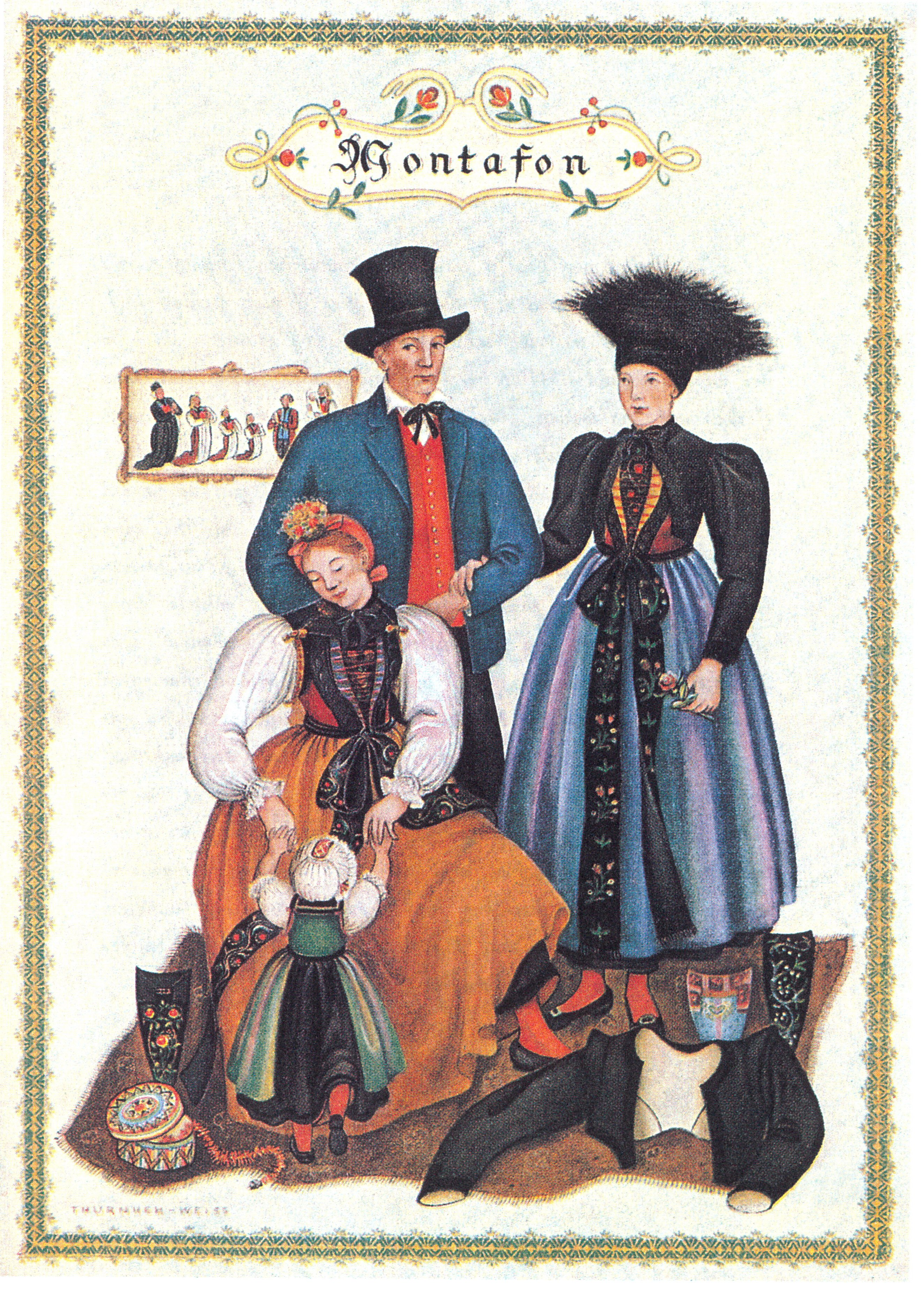
"Trachtenbild 1 des Montafones" by Lisl Thurnher-Weiß (1957)

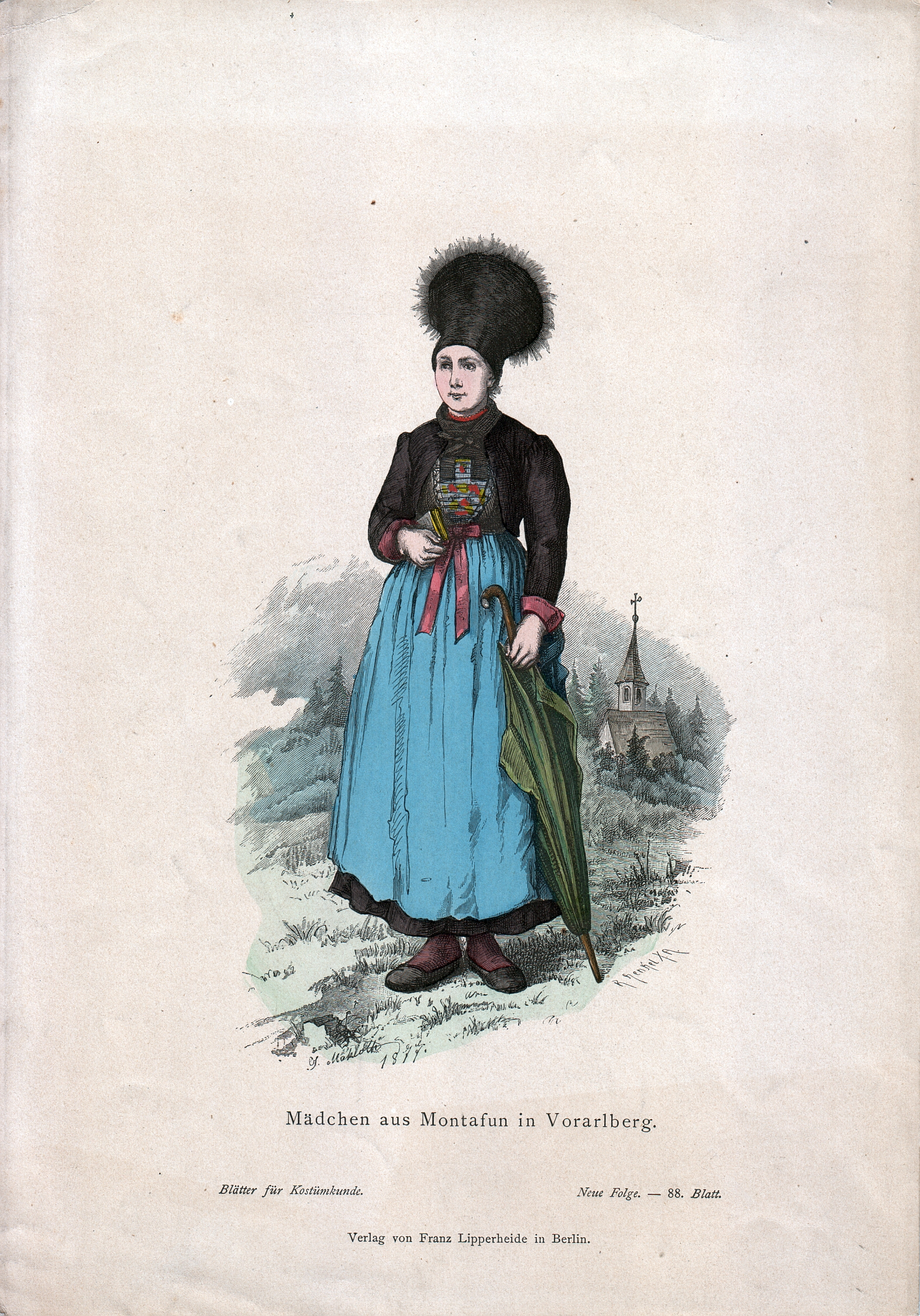
"Mädchen aus Montafon" (Maiden from Vorarlberg) in Vorarlberg, around 1880

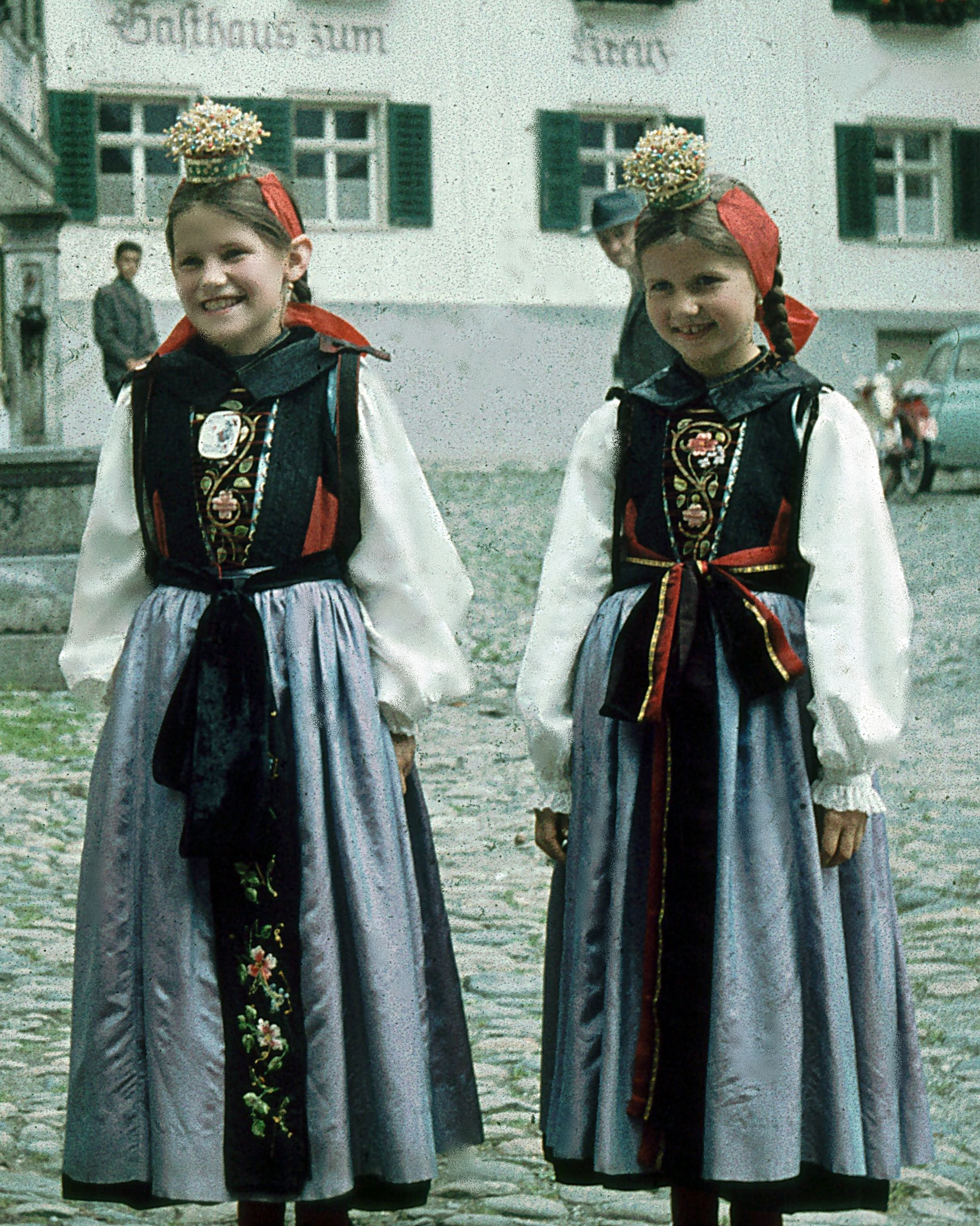
Montafoner Tracht (Schruns)

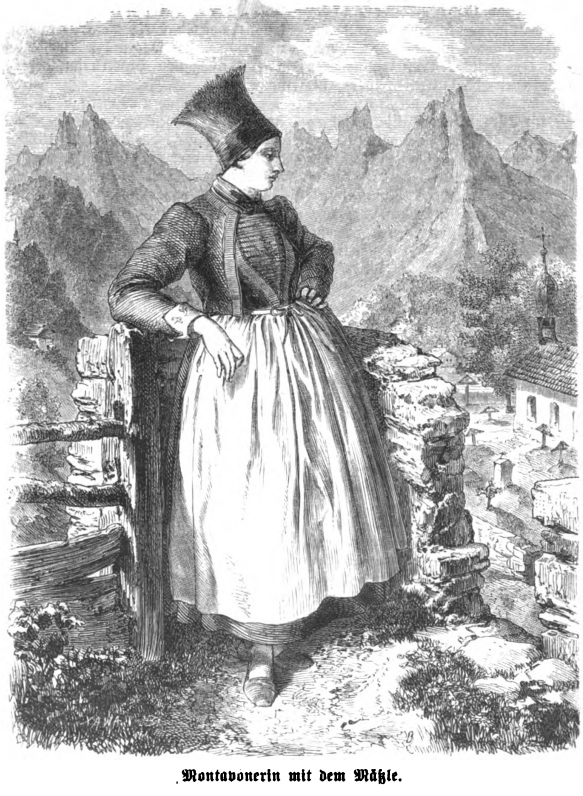
"Die Gartenlaube" (1865)

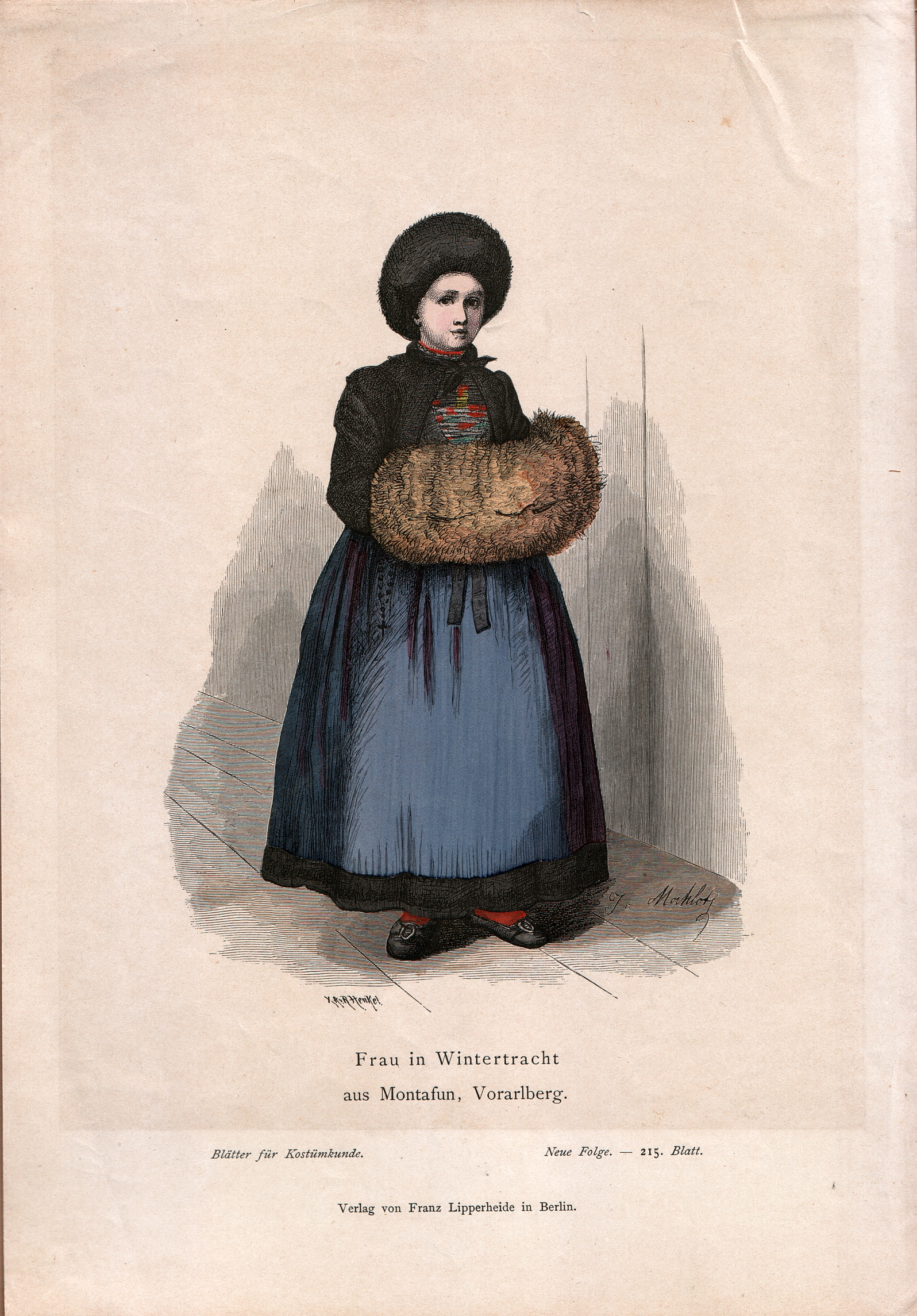
Montafon woman in wintertracht

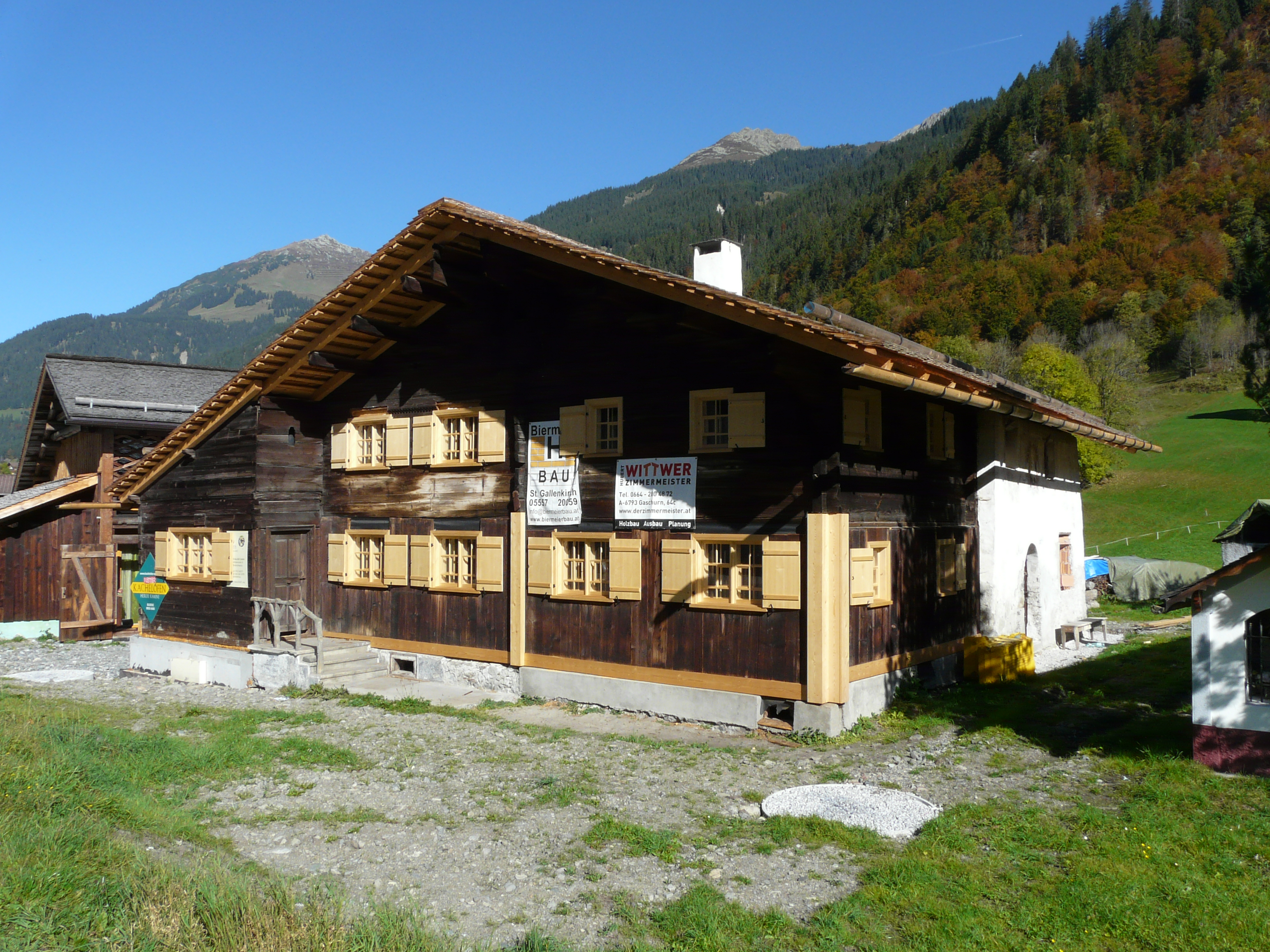
A Montafonerhaus in Gortipohl

=== Architecture ===
The Montafonerhaus is a house type in the Montafon valley from the 15th to the 20th century. It is a striking feature of the Montafon cultural landscape and is a characteristic of the valley. The classic Montafoner house mixes stone and wood elements.

=== Cuisine ===
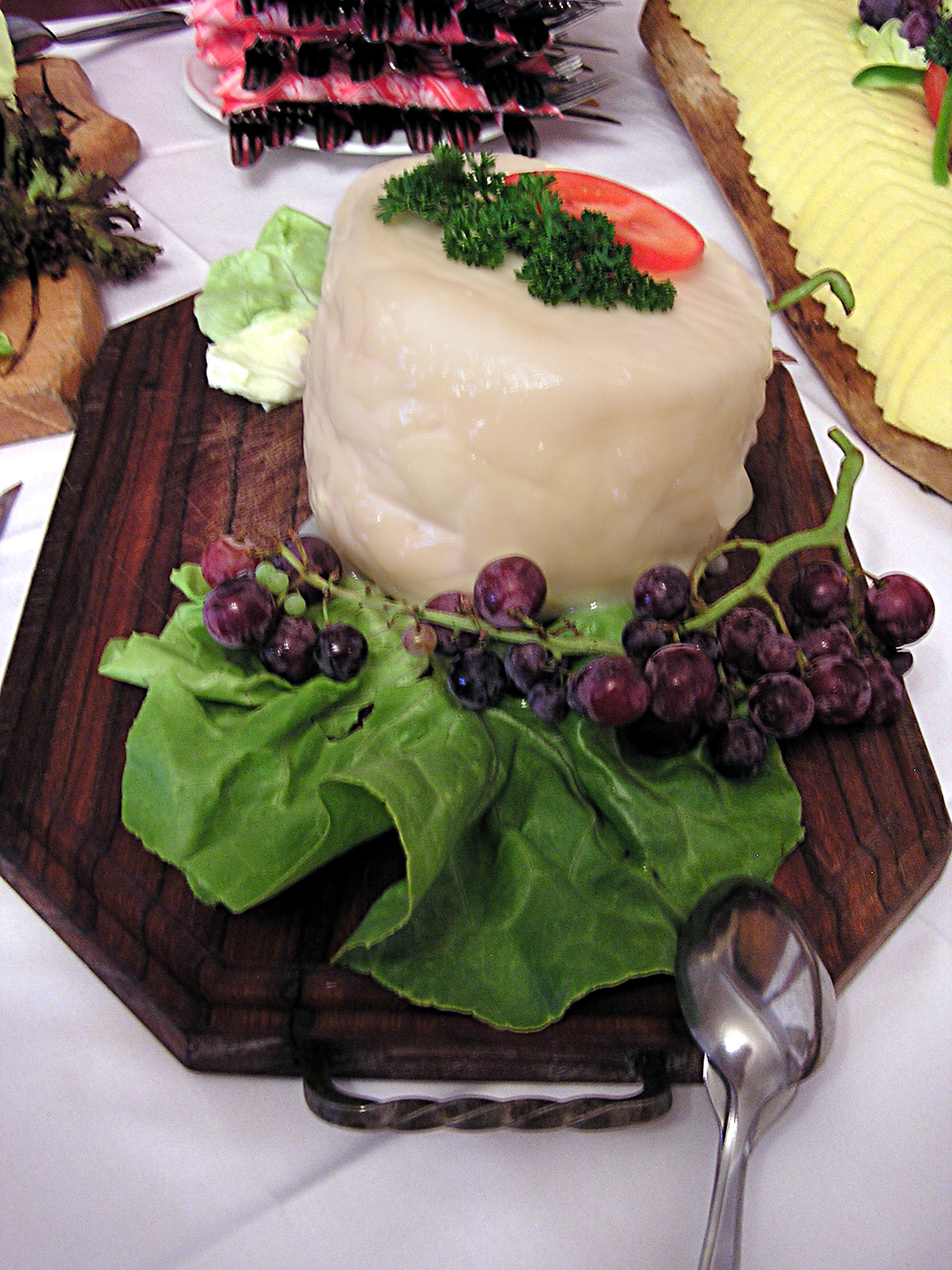
Sura Kees cheese

The Montafoner Sauerkäse or Montafon cheese (dialect: Sura Kees or Sura Käs, referring to a type of sour cream/curdled milk cheese) is a sour cream cheese made in the Montafon since the 12th century. Montafon has one of the oldest traditions of cheese production in the Alpine region, and this is still an important dairy product. It has very little fat (1-10% fat in dry matter) and is a local speciality, similar to the Tyrolean grey cheese.

=== Gauertaler Alpkultur ===
The LEADER programme Gauertaler Alpkultur was created to inform guests and locals in the Gauertal valley about the cultural landscape. Knowledge of this cultural landscape is slowly being lost. Therefore, this path was created to present the Gauertal as a good example of local alpine culture and alpine transhumances. As the trails in the Gauertal are quite popular, the hikers had to be routed in such a way that the sensitive alpine areas were no longer seriously affected. At 13 stations, objects were created by artists who devoted themselves to various cultural areas. Panels and info-brochures tell the stories about the land, the people and the culture.

The following artistic interventions have been created in the Gauertaler landscape:

1. Entrance gate
2. Tree of Myths (alpine myths)
3. Note 1: water & alpine pastures
4. Watcher (shepherd's life)
5. Alpine regions & tourism (no sculpture)
6. Note 2 (forest challenges)
7. Tribune (life in the Maisäß)
8. Cloakroom (changes of culture)
9. Avalanche tree (natural hazards)
10. Battlefield (history in the Alps)
11. Alpinism (no sculpture)
12. Cheese harp (life and work)
13. Antler tree (alp and hunting)

There are three different paths and each tells a different story:

- Main tour: Gauertaler Alpkultur: Grüneck (1,890 meters; 6,200 ft) - Obere Latschätzalpe - Obere Sporaalpe - Lindauer Hütte - untere Sporaalpe - untere Latschätzalpe - Wachters Dieja - Plazadels - Matschwitz. Length: 12.7 km (7.9 mi); duration: approx. four ours
- Alptour: Grüneck (1,890 meters; 6,200 ft) - Obere Latschätzalpe - Obere Sporaalpe - Lindauer Hütte - untere Sporaalpe - untere Latschätzalpe - Gauen - Latschau. Length: 11.3 km (7.0 mi); duration: approx. 3.5 hours
- Maisäßtour (tour of alpine transhumance): Grüneck (1,890 meters; 6,200 ft) - Obere Latschätzalpe - Wachters Dieja - Plazadels - Matschwitz. Length: 6.7 km (4.2 mi); duration: approx 2.5 hours

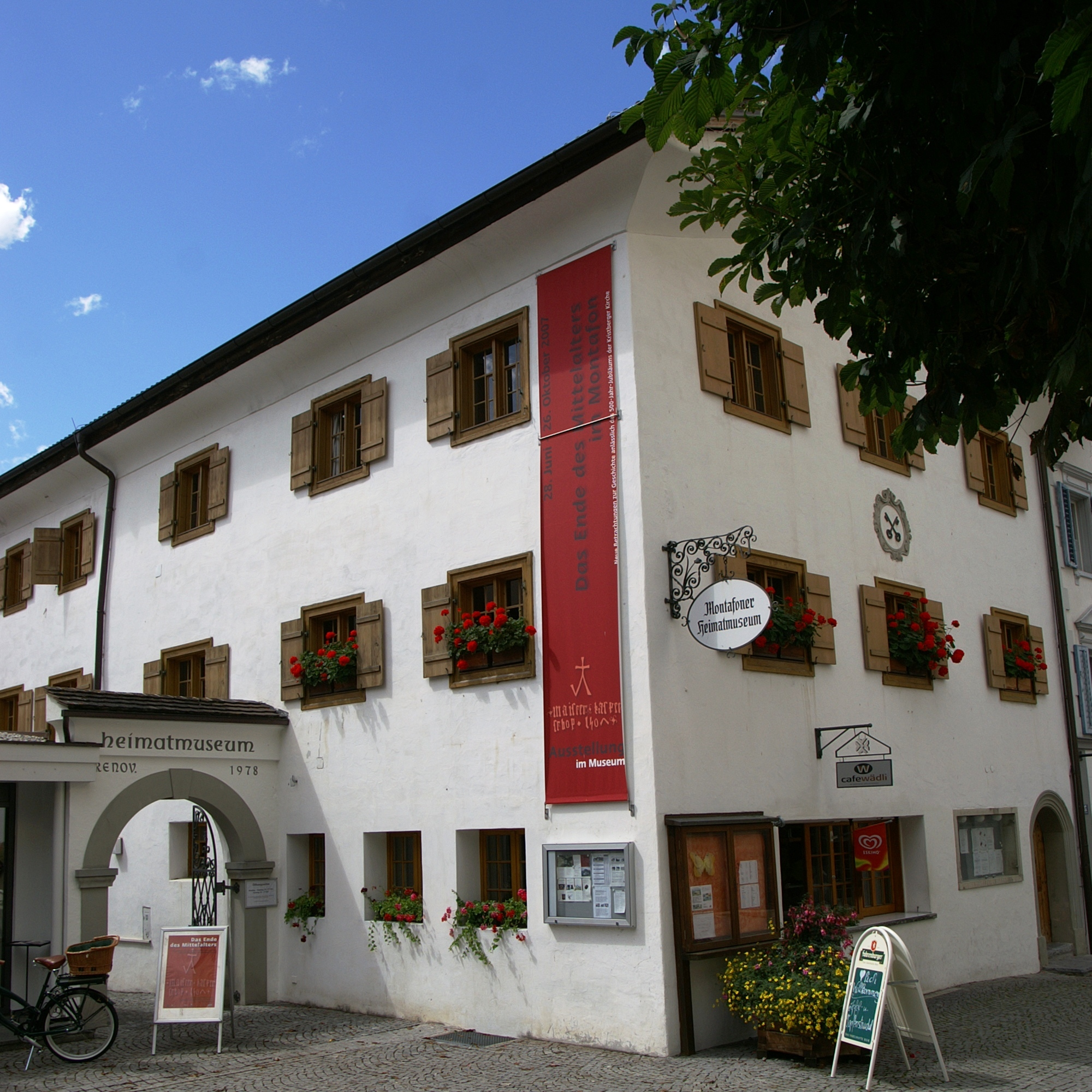
Heimatmuseum Schruns

=== Museums ===
In the Montafon valley, there are four museums:

- Heimatmuseum Schruns (Schruns Museum of Local History, de)
- Alpin- und Tourismusmuseum Gaschurn (Gaschurn Alpine and Tourism Museum)
- Bergbaumuseum Silbertal (Mining Museum Silbertal)
- Museum Frühmesshaus Bartholomäberg

== Trivia ==
Ernest Hemingway spent two winters in Montafon: 1924/25 and 1925/26. In 1926, John dos Passos and Gerald Murphy visited him there. The Snows of the Kilimanjaro (1936) and several other novels and short stories were written in, or they contain material about, the Montafon and the Silvretta glaciers.

The famous German novelist and poet Erich Kästner also repeatedly visited the valley, as did the former German chancellor Helmut Kohl. The noted opera singer Elisabeth Schwarzkopf spent her last years in Schruns, where she died on 2 August 2006.

== See also ==
- Alpine Transhumance
- List of museums in Vorarlberg

== Photo gallery ==
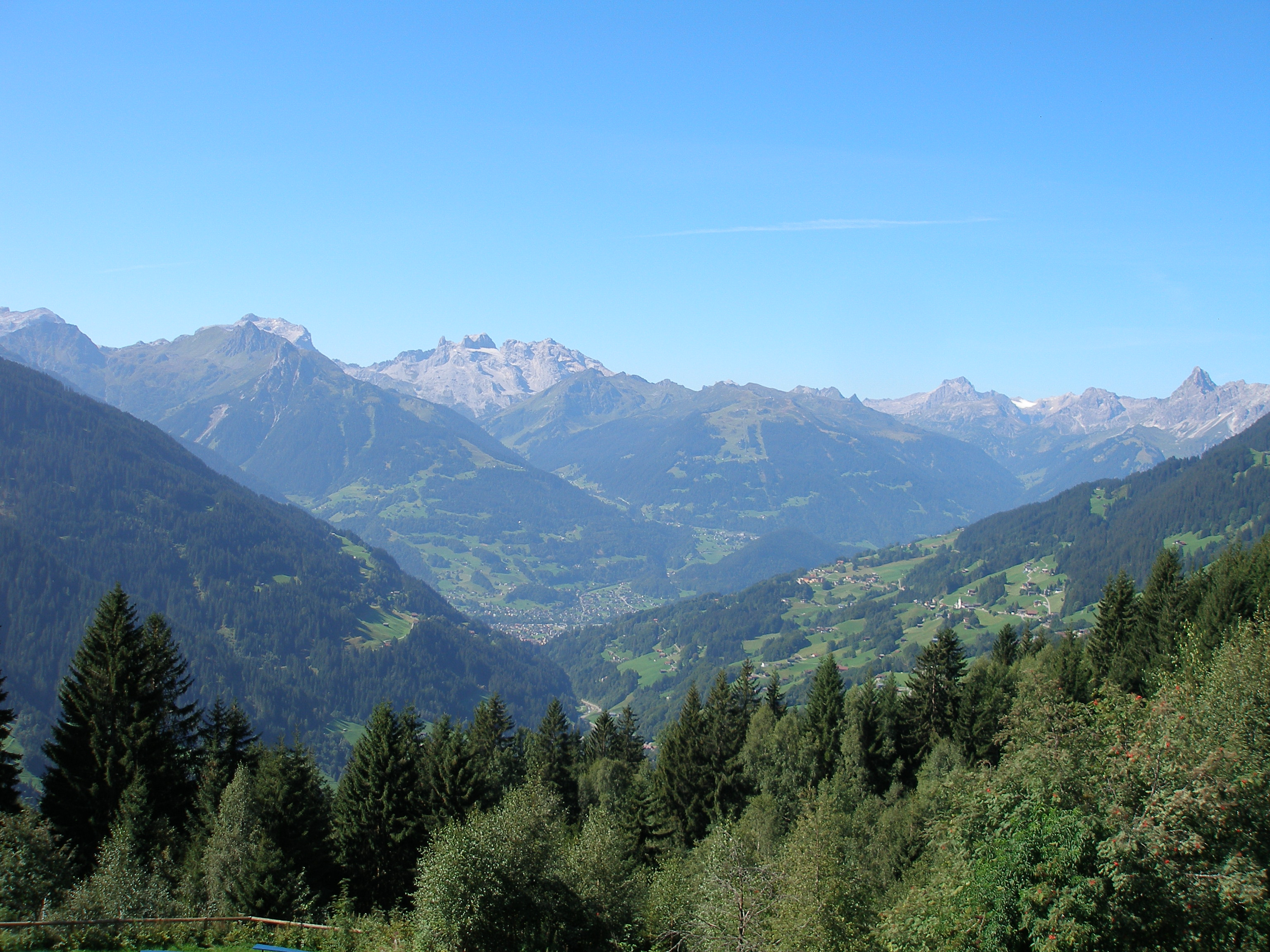
View into the valley

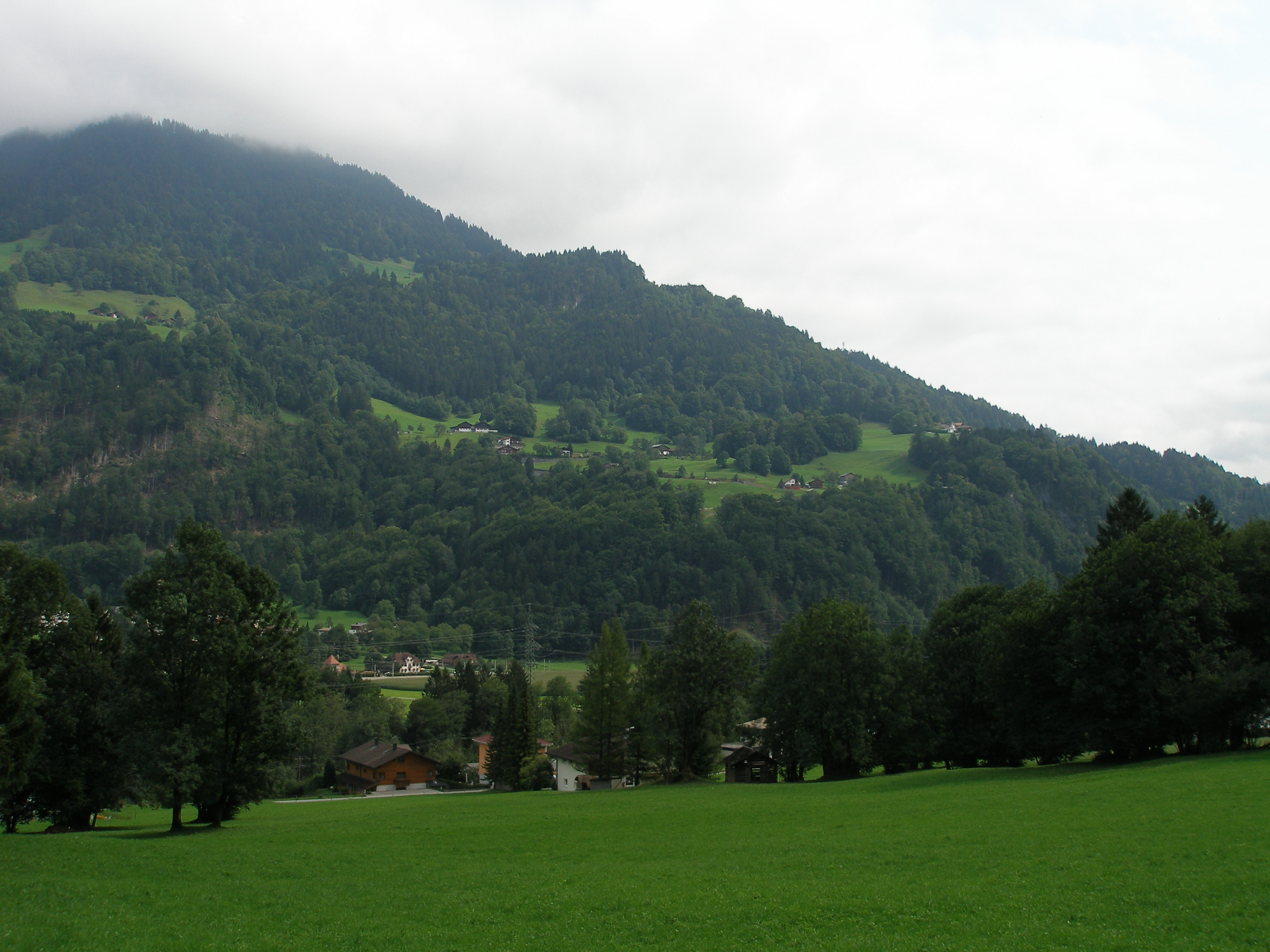
View into the valley

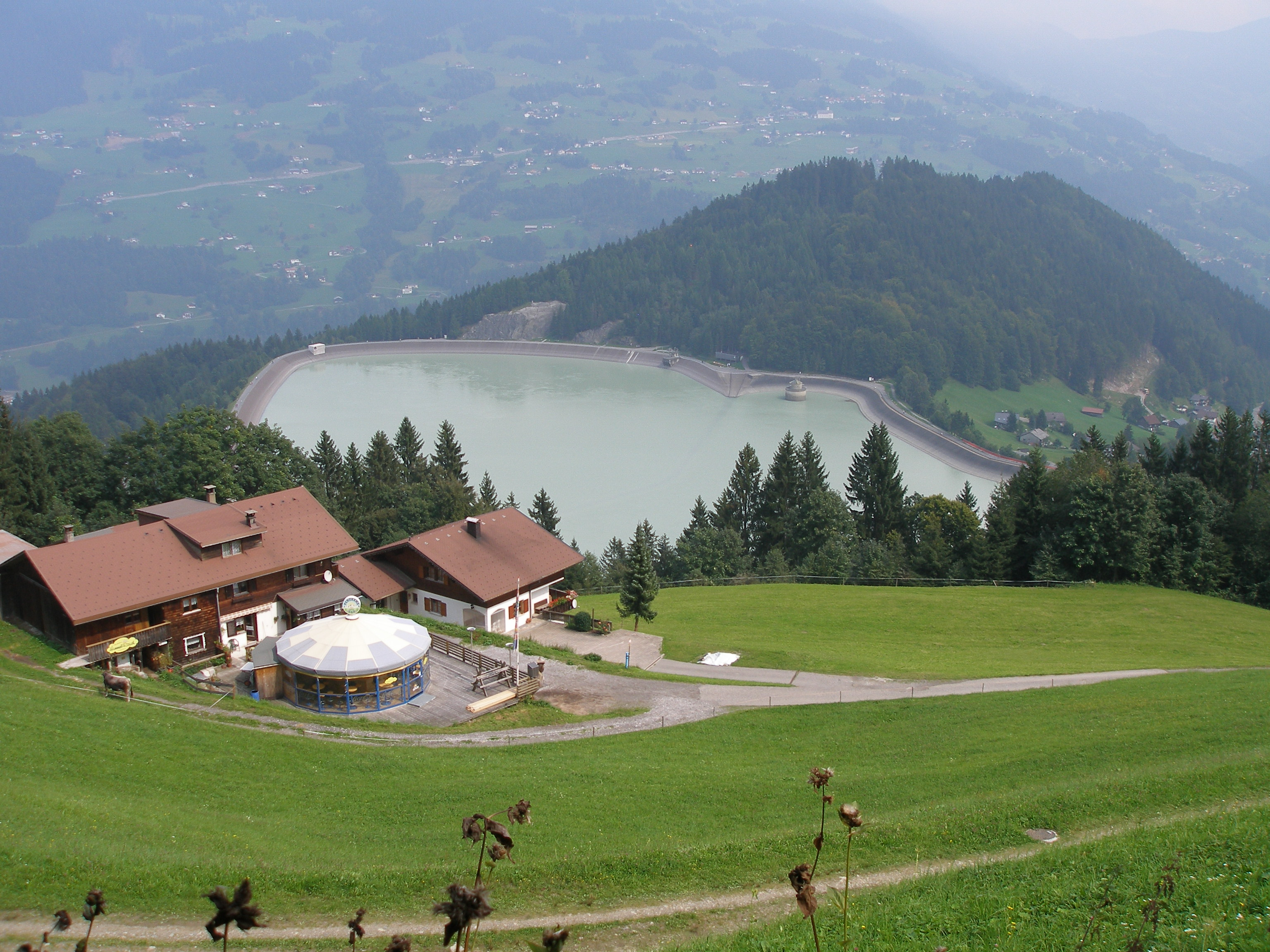
View into the valley

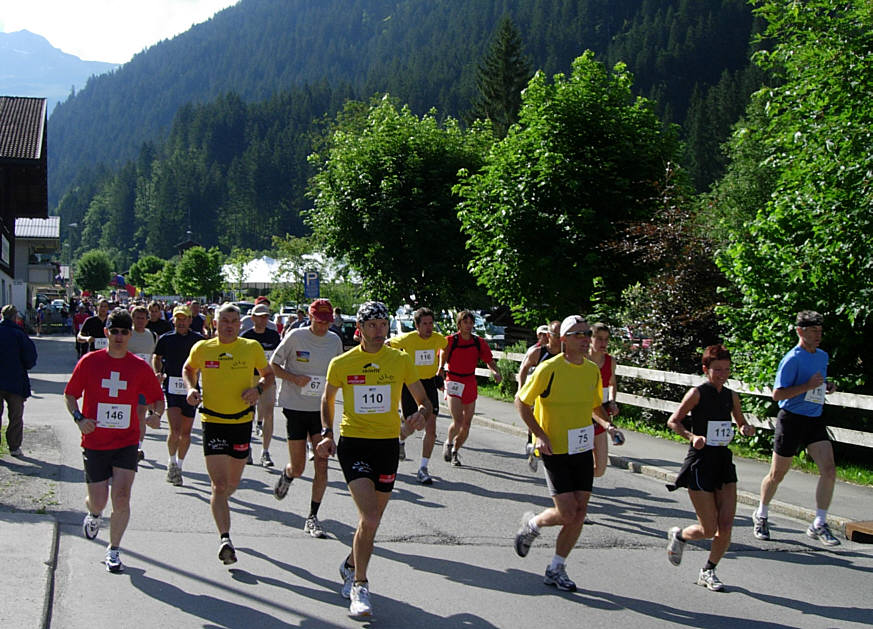
Montafon-Arlberg marathon (2005)

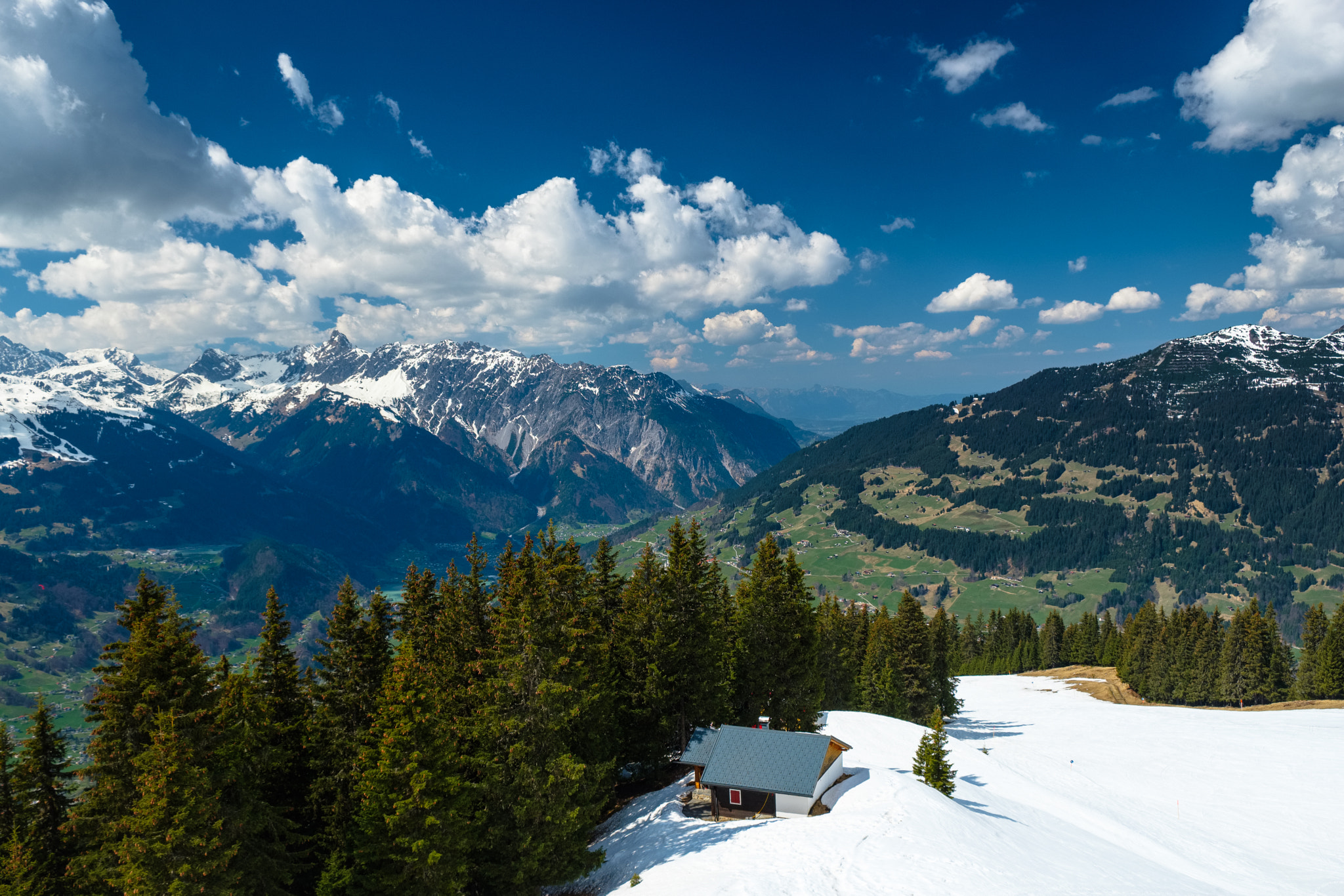
Schruns in the Montafon valley

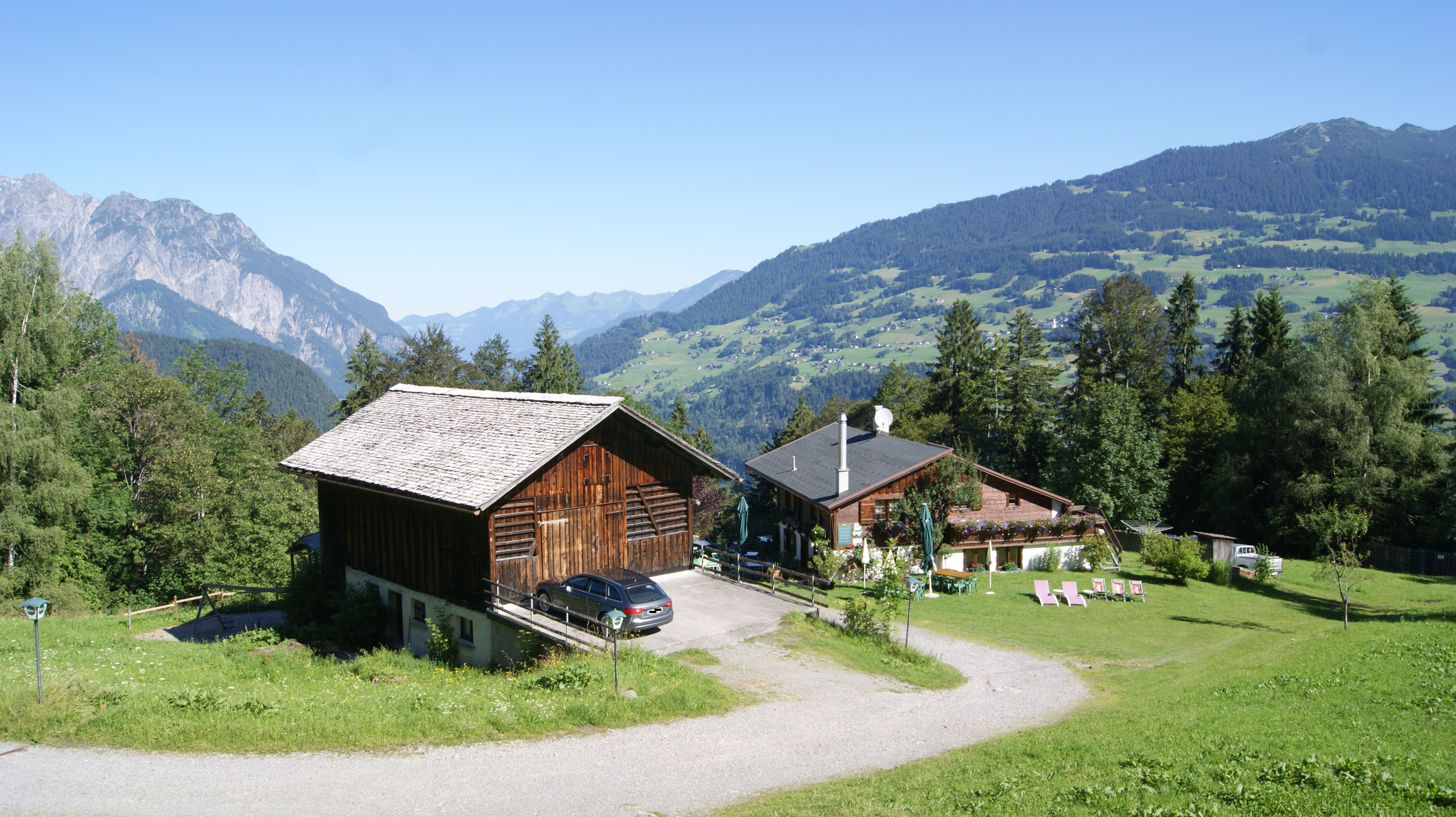
Jausenstation Bitschweil (small eatery) in Tschagguns
