= SLMM =

SLMM may refer to:

- Saint Lucia Medal of Merit
- Saunders Lakeland Mountain Marathon
- Society of Layerists in MultiMedia
- Special Law for Municipal Mergers
- Sri Lanka Monitoring Mission
- Submarine Launched Mobile Mines
