= Montafon-Arlberg Marathon =

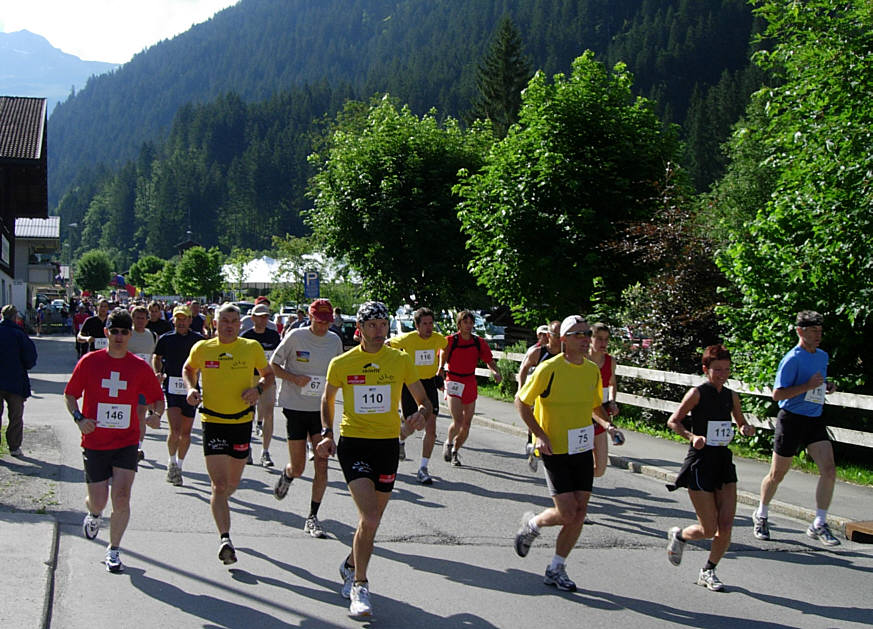
- Montafon-Arlberg Marathon in 2005
- Date: June or July
- Location: Vorarlberg / Tyrol Austria
- Distance: Marathon, T33 Trail (33 km), Panorama Trail (15 km), Children's Trail
- Established: 2003 (23 years ago)
- Website: www.montafon.at/montafon-arlberg-marathon/de

The Montafon-Arlberg Marathon is an annual mountain marathon in the Austrian states of Vorarlberg and Tyrol that has been held since 2003.

== The marathon trails ==
The marathon covers a distance of 42.195 metres along alpine paths and forest trails with 1,600 meters in altitude. The course traverses the provincial borders and connects the Verwall Valley in Tyrol with the Silbertal in Vorarlberg. Since June 29, 2019, the mountain marathon starts in St. Anton am Arlberg and ends after 42.195 kilometers in the Montafon municipality of Silbertal. Before, it had been the other way around.

=== Variations ===
In addition to the classic marathon, the Montafon-Arlberg Trail (T33) is ideal for ambitious amateur athletes: the T33, with a distance of 33 km and 1,190 meters of altitude, leads through unique flora and fauna.

With a length of 16 km and a difference in altitude of around 600 m, the Panorama Trail run is ideal for all hobby and recreational runners. The panorama trail takes place in St. Anton am Arlberg.
