= Arctic Midnight Orienteering =

Orienteering competition in Ilulissat, Greenland

- Date: Primo July
- Location: Ilulissat
- Event type: Fell running
- Distance: Orienteering
- Primary sponsor: Profil Optik; H.A.P.s Agentur
- Established: 1999
- Website: IOG.gl

The Arctic Midnight Orienteering or the AMO is an annual orienteering event usually held in the last week of June at Ilulissat. The run consist of 3 – 4 races over 4 days which is; the Unofficial North Greenland championships in classic orienteering, Sprint (running) and the Extreme Race Arctic Midnight Orienteering at about (5 km or 3.1 mi), (10 km or 6.2 mi), (15 km or 9.3 mi) and (20 km or 12 mi) difficult orienteering in physically demanding terrain.

Orienteering maps of an area of (15 km^{2} or 5.8 mi^{2}) in 1:10.000 and 1:15.000, contour interval 5 m.

The race is organized by Ilulissat Orienteering Greenland (IOG) and has been run every year since 1999.

== See also ==
- Orienteering
- Sprint (running)
- O-Ringen
- Saunders Lakeland Mountain Marathon
