= Montafoner Resonanzen =

- Genre: classical music, organ, jazz, brass music, Austrian folk music, cross-over
- Dates: annually on several weekends throughout August and September
- Locations: Montafon, Vorarlberg (Austria)
- Years active: 1977 – present
- Founders: Bernd-H. Becher
- Website: https://www.montafon.at/montafoner-resonanzen/de

Montafoner Resonanzen is a music festival consisting of a series of events in the Montafon region of Vorarlberg (Austria). It takes place annually on several weekends in August and September at varying locations.

== History ==
In 1977, the festival was founded by Bernd-H. Becher as series of events under the name of Montafoner Sommerkonzerte. The founder has accompanied the festival for over 20 years. The festival was constantly expanded.

After the re-establishment in 2002 by the Stand Montafon (an association of ten Montafon municipalities), the first Montafon summer took place in 2004. From 2004 to 2014, Nikolaus Netzer was responsible for the artistic direction. Since 2015, the festival runs under Markus Felbermayer as the organisational director, and Montafon Tourism as the organiser.

In 2017, the festival was renamed to Montafoner Resonanzen.

== About the festival ==
The Montafoner Resonanzen festival has around 2,700 visitors per year. More than 80 artists appear at over 20 events. There are nine partner hotels in the valley taking care of the accommodation of the guests. All concerts are performed at varying places that are authentic to the music, for example at the Tübinger hut on 2,191 m in Gaschurn ("Jazz at the Schutzhütte").

The music festival encompasses the genres of

- classical music and chamber music (Kammermusik),
- organ music (Within a small radius in the Montafon valley, 16 organs from four centuries can be found.)
- jazz,
- brass music (Blasmusik),
- Austrian folk music (Volksmusik),
- cross-over between genres.

== Photo gallery ==
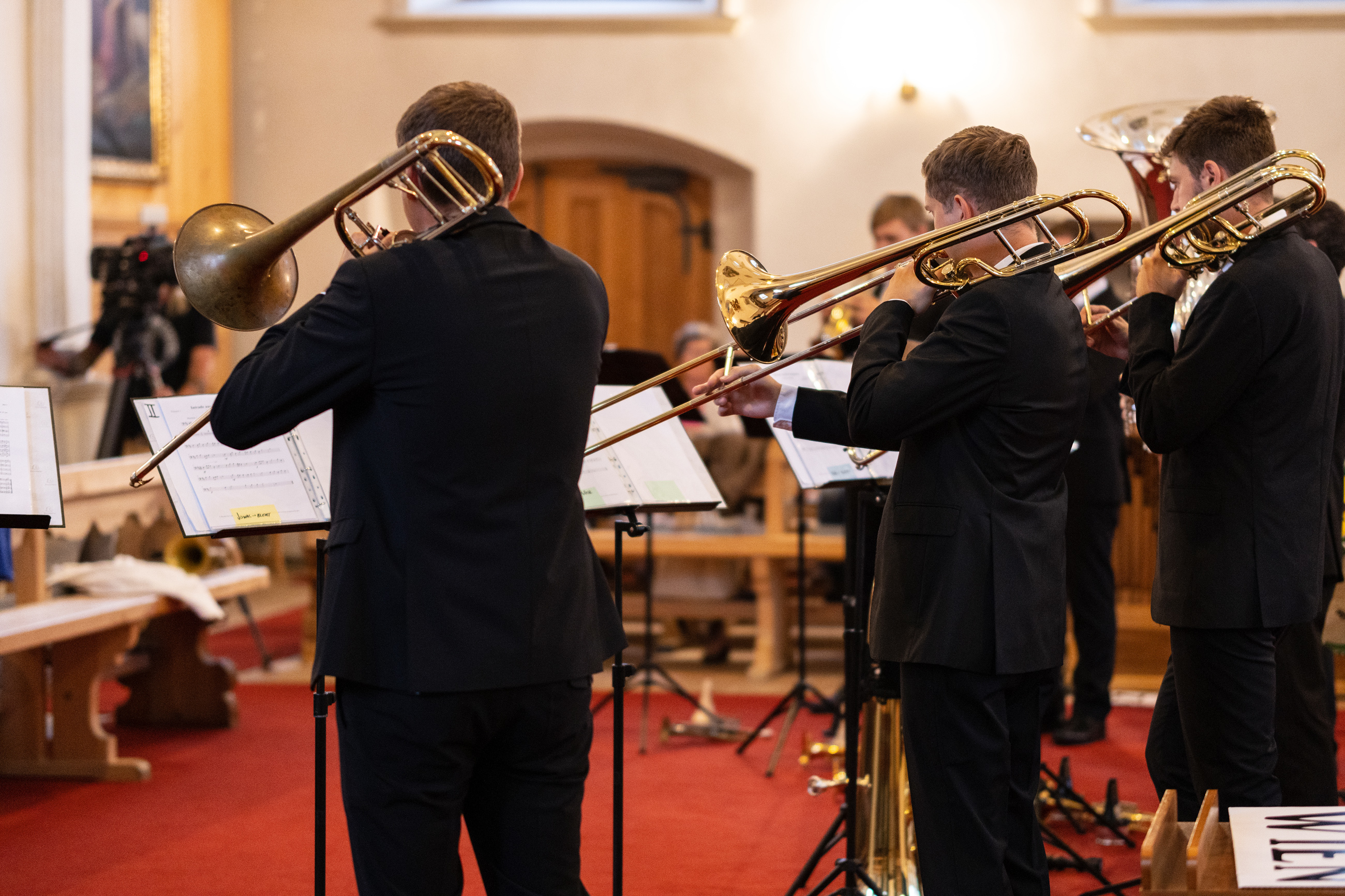
The band "Austrian Brass Consort" at the opening concert of the Montafoner Resonanzen 2020 at the parish and pilgrimage church in Tschagguns.

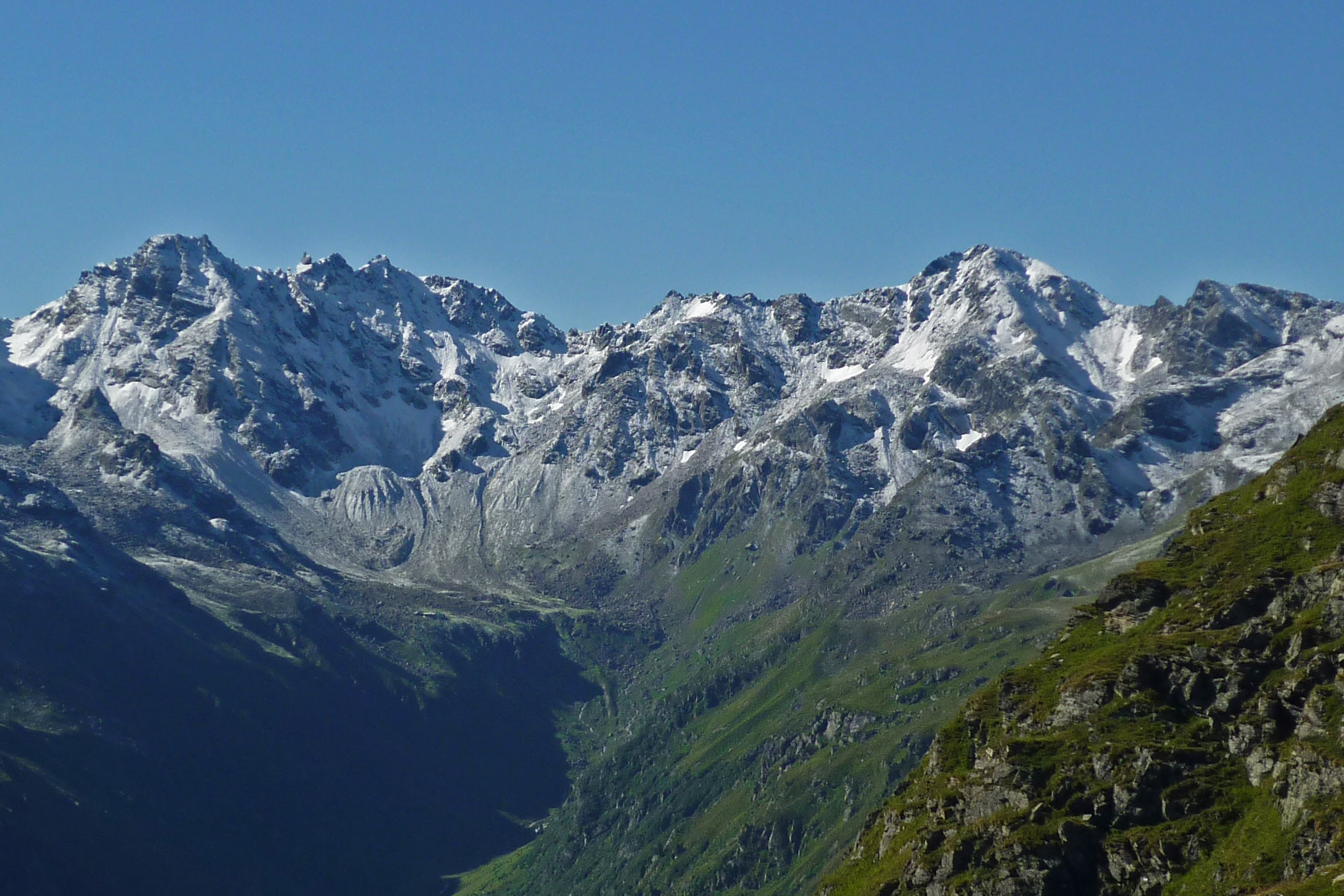
View at the Garneratal and the historic Tübinger Hütte.

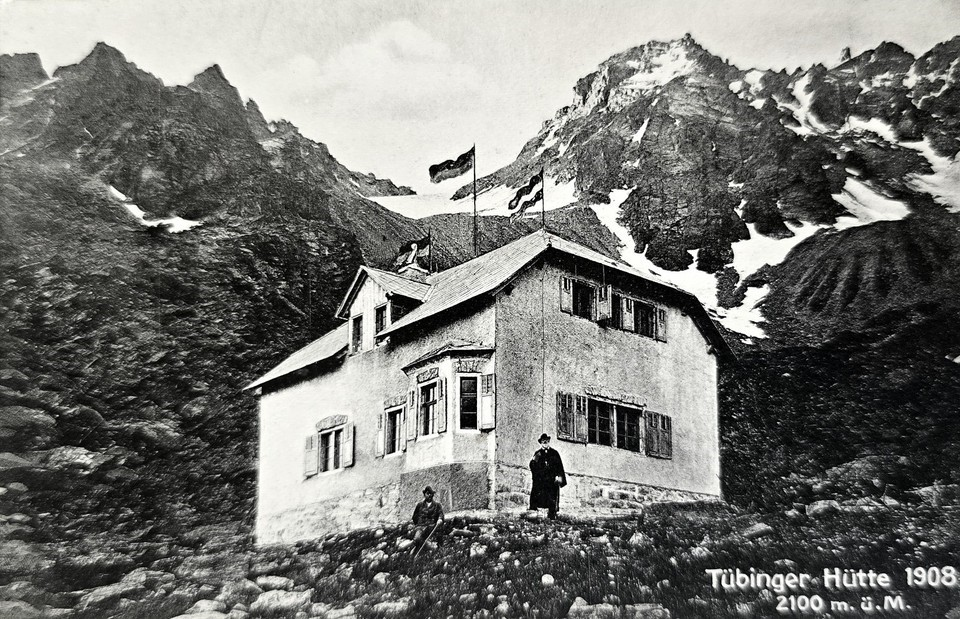
The historic Tübinger Hütte (1908) was the location of a Montafoner Resonanzen jazz concerts in 2018 and 2020.

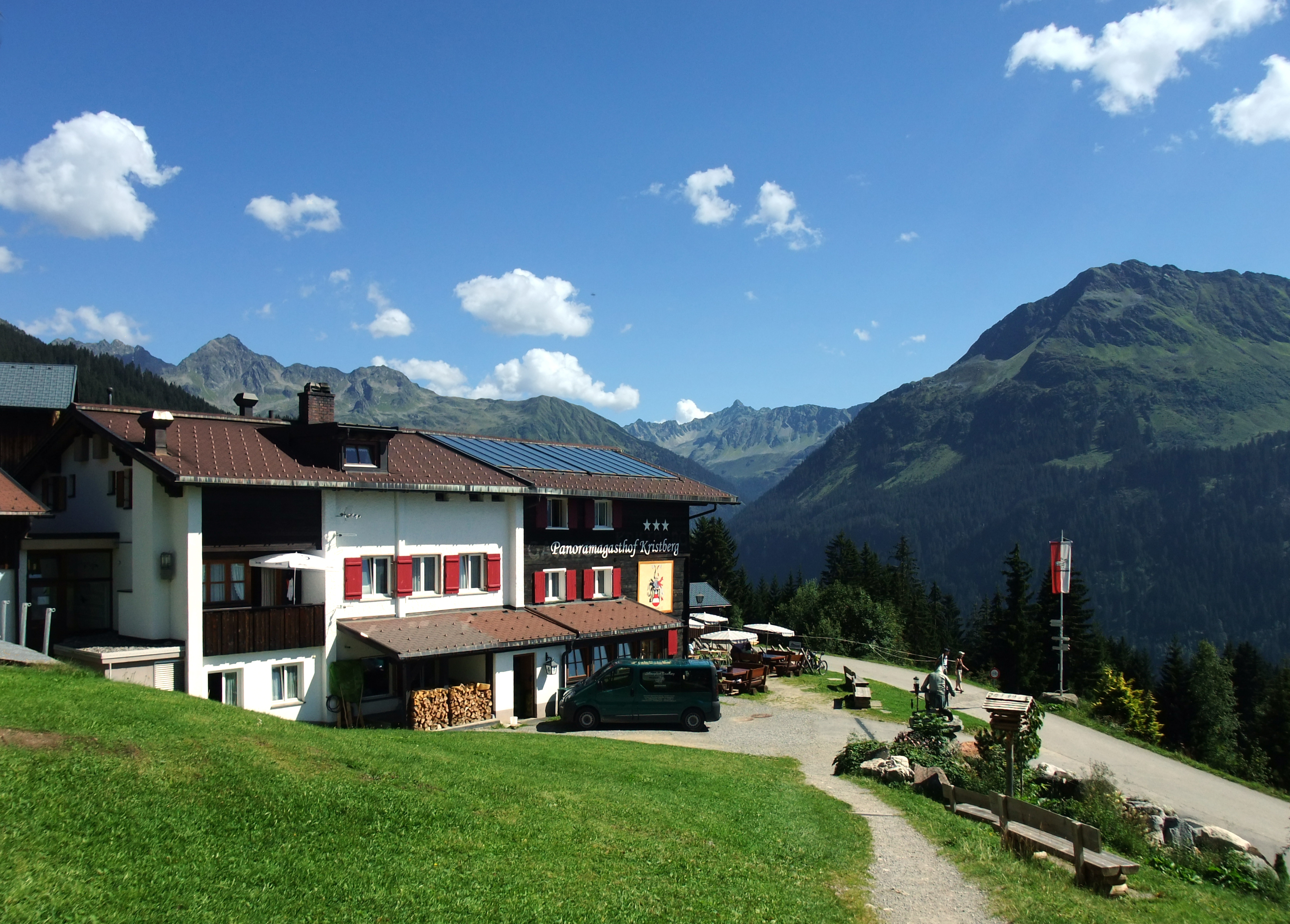
Another location of the Montafoner Resonanzen is the Panoramagasthof Kristberg.

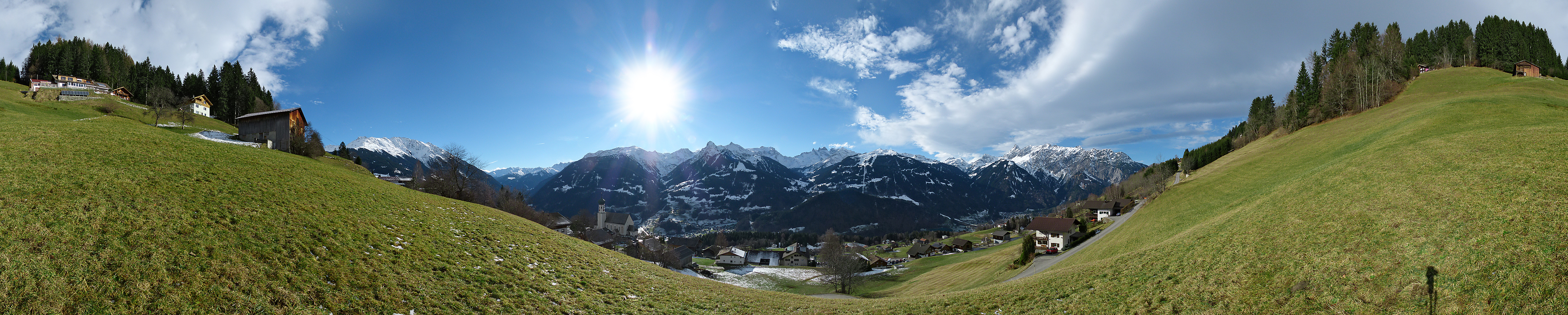
One of the locations of the Montafoner Resonanzen is the mountain village Bartholomäberg
