= Lowe Alpine Mountain Marathon =

Annual fell race in the Scottish Highlands

The Lowe Alpine Mountain Marathon (or LAMM) was a two-day fell running and orienteering race held in the Scottish Highlands each June.

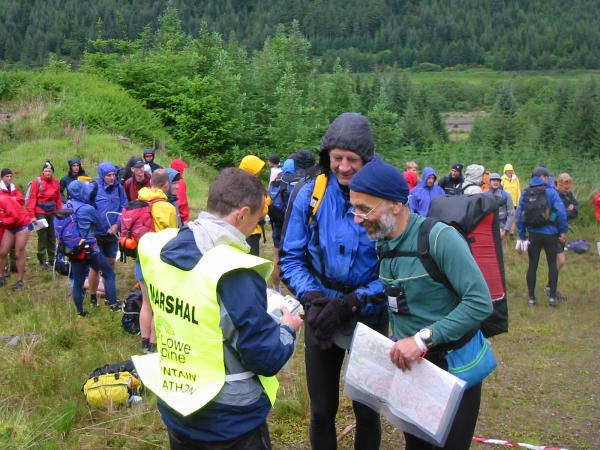
Yiannis Tridimas, Lowe Alpine Mountain Marathon

Teams of two ran and navigated over mountainous terrain, carrying all their gear for an overnight wild camp. LAMM had six classes of competition: Elite, A, B, C, D and Score. Over the two days, the elite competitors complete a course of approximately 70km with 4000m of ascent over challenging terrain.

The event location was kept secret until 48 hours before the start, and competitors do not know where the route will take them until they cross the start line. Teams were then given a series of grid reference checkpoints which they must navigate to and choose a route between.

LAMM was often considered to be the smaller cousin of the Karrimor International Mountain Marathon, later known as the OMM, the original event of this kind. Unlike KIMM/OMM, competition for places was not so fierce on LAMM and most who applied got a place first time. LAMM called itself the Connoisseurs Mountain Marathon, and was celebrated amongst competitors for its unexpected twists and impeccable logistical organisation. Since the first event in Arrochar in 1994, the event has seen a steady increase in numbers, with over 550 teams entering in 2005.

The organiser of LAMM, Martin Stone was himself an elite fell runner. Notable competitors included Sir Ranulph Fiennes.

2018 was the final running of the event on the Isle of Harris.

== Event locations ==
- 1994 – Arrochar
- 1995 – Isle of Mull
- 1996 – Lochaber
- 1997 – Isle of Jura
- 1998 – Ardgour
- 1999 – Black Mount
- 2000 – Glen Shiel
- 2001 – Kinloch Laggan
- 2002 – Braes of Balquhidder
- 2003 – Spittal of Glenshee
- 2004 – Glen Carron
- 2005 – Isle of Mull
- 2006 – Assynt
- 2007 – Glen Lochay
- 2008 – Glenfinnan
- 2009 – Kintail
- 2010 – Glen Fyne
- 2011 – Beinn Dearg
- 2012 – Ben Cruachan
- 2013 – No event
- 2014 – Strathcarron
- 2015 – No event
- 2016 – No event
- 2017 – An Teallach, Fisherfield & Fannichs
- 2018 – Isle of Harris
