= Society of Layerists in MultiMedia =

Artist network

The Society of Layerists in Multi-Media (SLMM) is a group of artists, centred in Albuquerque, New Mexico, United States, and formed in 1982. It describes itself as a network for artists and other persons interested in a holistic perspective. The Society has members at, and affiliations with, Michigan Tech.

== Layering ==
The society was formed to look at the concept it refers to as "Layering" on a deeper level.

The society describes layering, in the context it uses the word, as something other than a label for a particular style or medium: it defines Layering as a way of making art in order to express ultimate connectedness, or a way to think about creating art as a synthesis of ideas from many sources. These include the sciences, philosophy, metaphysics, memories, synchronicities, and the imagination. The society suggests that a sense something "other" than the visible inhabits a Layered work, and that a Layered work is not distinguished by the technique so much as by "the mind of the artist who makes it"; that the Layering is an evanescent, as well as a tangible, metaphor that "grows like moss from living and learning".

Mary Carroll Nelson, founder of SLMM, observes that "In layered art, many events connect at a single point in space; and many points in space are linked at a single moment in time." Alexander Nepote, SLMM’s late mentor, expressed an idea that is relevant to Layering: "Energy that connects everything is a cosmic web— this includes information from the collective unconscious, the metaphysical as well as the physical."

The purpose of SLMM is to offer creative artists a holistic way to relate to one another, as differentiated from the academic structure of professional artists' associations based on a single medium, such as watercolor, pastel, or sculpture. The network is meant to act as a leavening in a society whose values are based on a system of separation through competition, careerism, and hierarchy. SLMM is a society of equals designed to encourage creative expression and dynamic growth. The society reports that many members follow a personal path of aesthetics combined with an active interest in wholeness.

== See also ==
- Visionary art
