= Bartholomäberg =

- Municipality
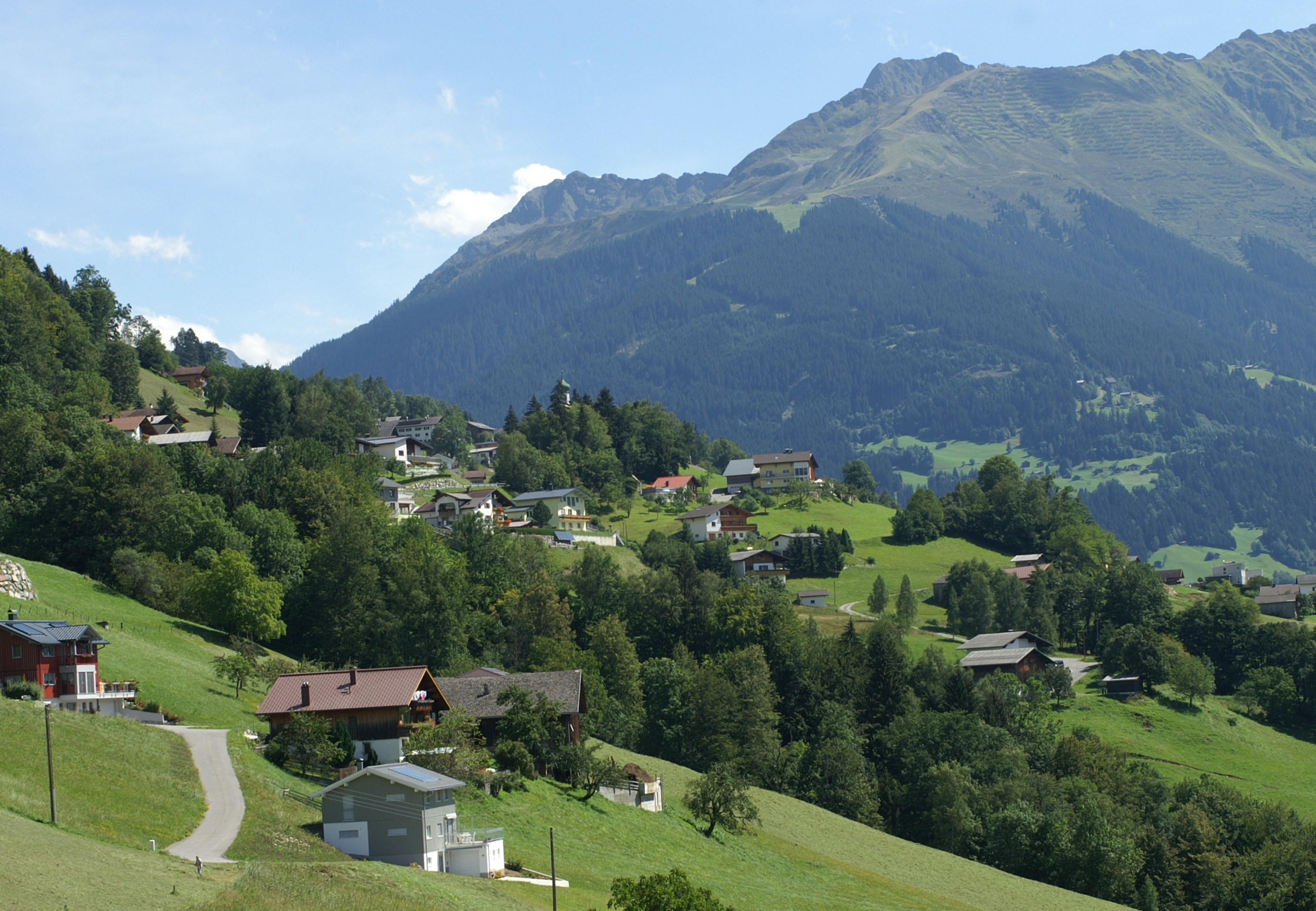

- Coat of arms

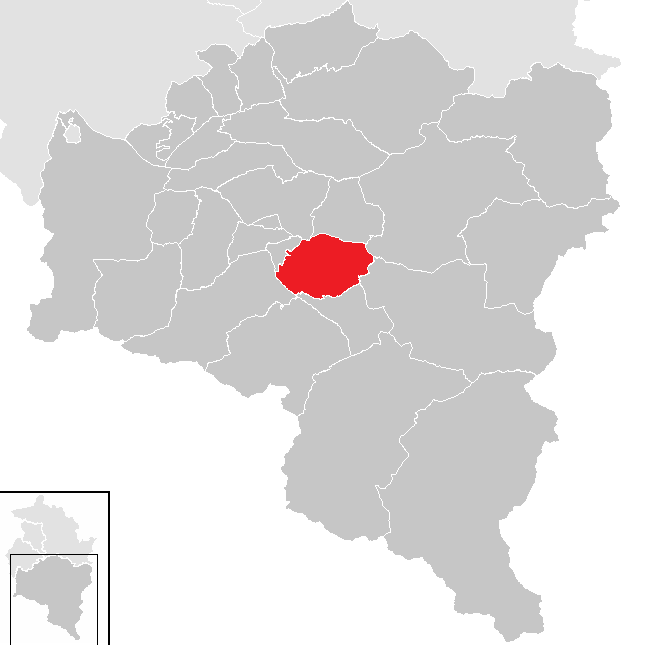
- Location in the district

- Location within Austria
- Coordinates: 47°05′N 09°54′E
- Country: Austria
- State: Vorarlberg
- District: Bludenz

Government
  - Mayor: Martin Vallaster

Area
  - Total: 27.3 km^{2} (10.5 sq mi)
- Elevation: 1,087 m (3,566 ft)

Population (2018-01-01)
  - Total: 2,352
  - Density: 86.2/km^{2} (223/sq mi)
- Time zone: UTC+1 (CET)
  - Summer (DST): UTC+2 (CEST)
- Postal code: 6781
- Website: http://www.bartholomaeberg.at

Bartholomäberg is a municipality and a village in the district of Bludenz in the Austrian state of Vorarlberg.
