= Silbertal =

- Municipality
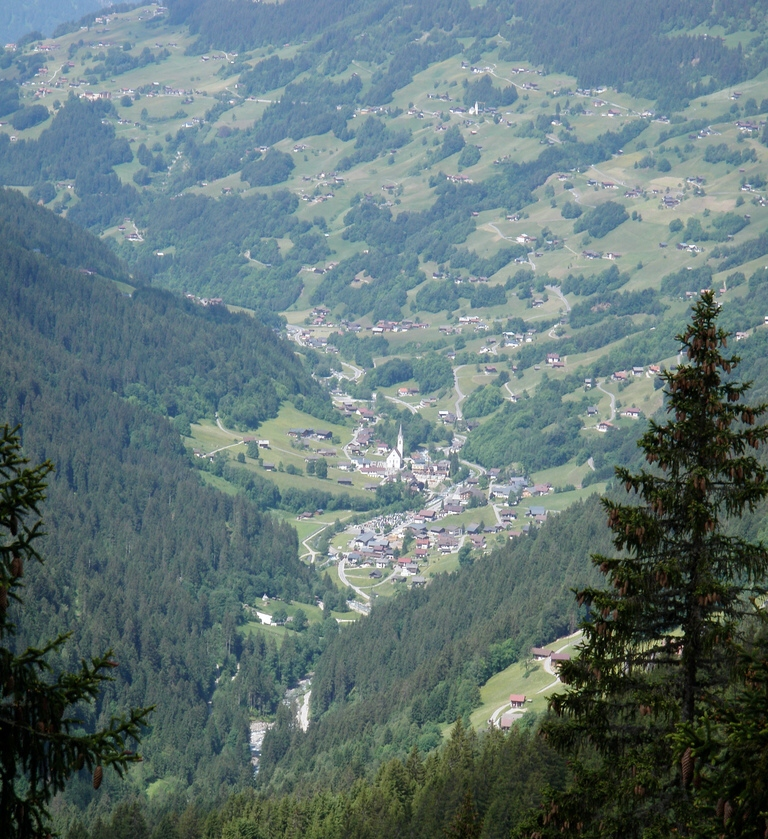

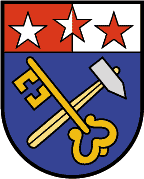
- Coat of arms

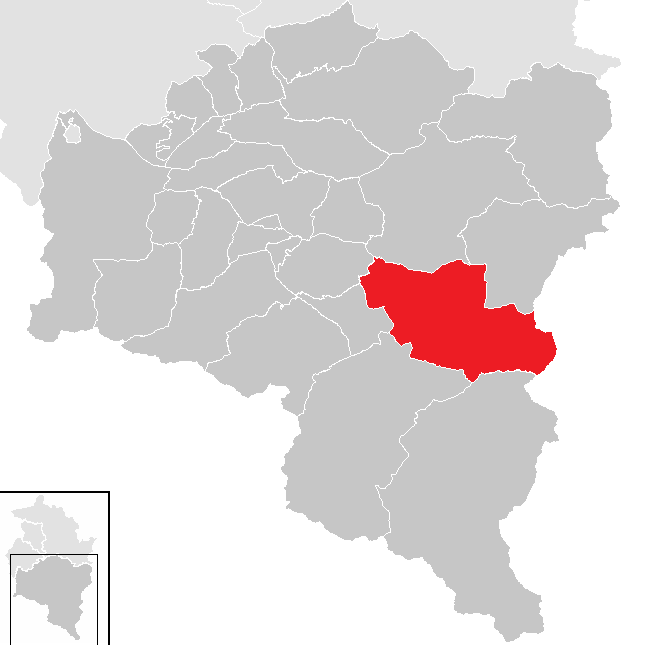
- Location in the district

- Location within Austria
- Coordinates: 47°04′00″N 09°58′00″E
- Country: Austria
- State: Vorarlberg
- District: Bludenz

Government
  - Mayor: Thomas Zudrell

Area
  - Total: 88.6 km^{2} (34.2 sq mi)
- Elevation: 889 m (2,917 ft)

Population (2018-01-01)
  - Total: 834
  - Density: 9.41/km^{2} (24.4/sq mi)
- Time zone: UTC+1 (CET)
  - Summer (DST): UTC+2 (CEST)
- Postal code: 6780
- Area code: 05556
- Vehicle registration: BZ
- Website: www.silbertal.at

Silbertal is a municipality in the district of Bludenz in the Austrian state of Vorarlberg.

== Population ==
Historical population
Year	Pop.	±%
1869	646	—
1880	645	−0.2%
1890	637	−1.2%
1900	593	−6.9%
1910	541	−8.8%
1923	467	−13.7%
1934	540	+15.6%
1939	523	−3.1%
1951	582	+11.3%
1961	629	+8.1%
1971	774	+23.1%
1981	834	+7.8%
1991	347	−58.4%
2001	873	+151.6%
2011	869	−0.5%
