= Mountain marathon =

Variant of fell running

Mountain marathon is a type of fell running, typically held over two days, and often features a strong orienteering element. Competitors usually participate in teams of two and carry their own food, tent, and other essential gear. Events feature various classes (e.g., for the Original Mountain Marathon: Elite, A, B, C, D, and Long, Medium, and Short Score).

== Major Events ==
Several well-known mountain marathon events take place each year:

- Marmot Dark Mountains – Held on the last weekend of January.
- Lowe Alpine Mountain Marathon (LAMM) – Formerly held in the Scottish Highlands in June; ended in 2018.
- Scottish Mountain Marathon (SMM) – A new event in Scotland, also held in June.
- Saunders Lakeland Mountain Marathon (SLMM) – Takes place in or near the Lake District in early July.
- Mourne Mountain Marathon – Held in the Mourne Mountains, County Down, Northern Ireland in September.
- ROC Mountain Marathon – Held on the last weekend of September.
- Original Mountain Marathon (OMM) – Formerly the Karrimor International Mountain Marathon (KIMM); takes place in a UK hill or mountain area on the last weekend of October.
- Swiss International Mountain Marathon – Held in Switzerland in mid-August. Formerly known as KIMM Switzerland, Mammut International Mountain Marathon, and R'adys Mountain Marathon.

The Highlander Mountain Marathon, which began in 2007 and was held in April within two hours' drive of Inverness, has now ended.
