= Saunders Lakeland Mountain Marathon =

The Saunders Lakeland Mountain Marathon (SLMM) is an annual two-day mountain marathon held in the English Lake District ('or its environs', such as the adjoining Howgill Fells) in early July. It was founded by David Meek, and sponsored by a long-time UK manufacturer of light-weight tents.

The SLMM has been held annually since 1978, apart from 2001, when the Lakeland fells were closed because of the Foot and Mouth crisis and 2020 because of the COVID-19 outbreak. 2025 was therefore the 46th event.

It is usually considered to be less 'hair-shirt' than the slightly older OMM (formerly the Karrimor), since the weather is often milder, the courses slightly shorter, and the overnight camp is often found to be within walking distance of a pub. However, there have been notable exceptions to this - in 2004 (the 26th event, out of Coniston) consistently poor weather over two days forced many teams to retire. In 1997 (the 20th event, starting from Grasmere) courses were set which meant many teams were still out on the Sunday evening, long after the prize-giving was due to take place.

The current event comprises seven courses for pairs of participants. The organisers encourage young competitors, with lower entry fees for Under 30s and there is a specific, handicapped class for parent and child (age 14+).

The Backpackers Club has traditionally provided marshals for the event. They assist at the registration and mid-way campsites and man the many checkpoints spread around the various routes.

The event uses largely volunteer basis. In 2018 the ownership was transferred to the newly formed Lakeland Events Community Interest Company (CIC) and is run on a not-for-profit basis.

Because of the popularity of the Lakes, courses are usually set to run 'across the grain' of the country, away from popular paths, so as to minimise erosion due to the race.

== Courses ==
The current event comprises seven courses. All are for pairs of participants.

Six of these are "linear" courses where participants must visit all controls in the prescribed order and the fastest cumulative time over two days wins. They are named after Lakeland fells: Scafell, Kirkfell, Carrock Fell, Harter Fell, Wansfell, Bedafell. The relative short Bedafell course is advertised as specifically for parent or guardian and child, and suitable for new entrants.

The other is the Fairfield "score" course - first introduced in 2018 - where participants visit as many controls as they can in a prescribed time limit, with penalties for being late back. Different controls have different point values and the highest cumulative overall points over two days wins.

There used to also be a "Klets" course, open to either pairs or solo runners, where participants had to collect all the controls, in any order, over the two days. The course was last run in 2018 after which it was removed on safety grounds for solo runners.

== List of locations ==
- 1978 Ambleside
- 1979 Ullswater
- 1980 Wasdale Head
- 1981 Rosthwaite
- 1982 Dockray
- 1983 Broughton Mills
- 1984 Braithwaite
- 1985 Askham
- 1986 Rosthwaite
- 1987 Eskdale
- 1988 Ullswater
- 1989 Buttermere
- 1990 Great Langdale
- 1991 Grasmere
- 1992 Buttermere
- 1993 Sedbergh
- 1994 Grasmere
- 1995 Coniston
- 1996 Great Langdale
- 1997 Grasmere
- 1998 Borrowdale
- 1999 Coniston
- 2000 Great Langdale
- 2001 No event due to Foot and Mouth
- 2002 Pooley Bridge
- 2003 St Johns in the Vale
- 2004 Coniston
- 2005 Ennerdale
- 2006 Grasmere
- 2007 High Street
- 2008 Helvellyn
- 2009 Coniston
- 2010 Sleddale
- 2011 Chapel Stile
- 2012 Wasdale Head
- 2013 Corney Fell
- 2014 Deepdale
- 2015 Torver
- 2016 Martindale
- 2017 Loweswater
- 2018 Haweswater
- 2019 Howgills
- 2020 No event due to COVID-19
- 2021 Honister
- 2022 Eskdale
- 2023 Coniston
- 2024 Haweswater
- 2025 Mickleden
