= Silvretta Montafon =

Austrian ski area

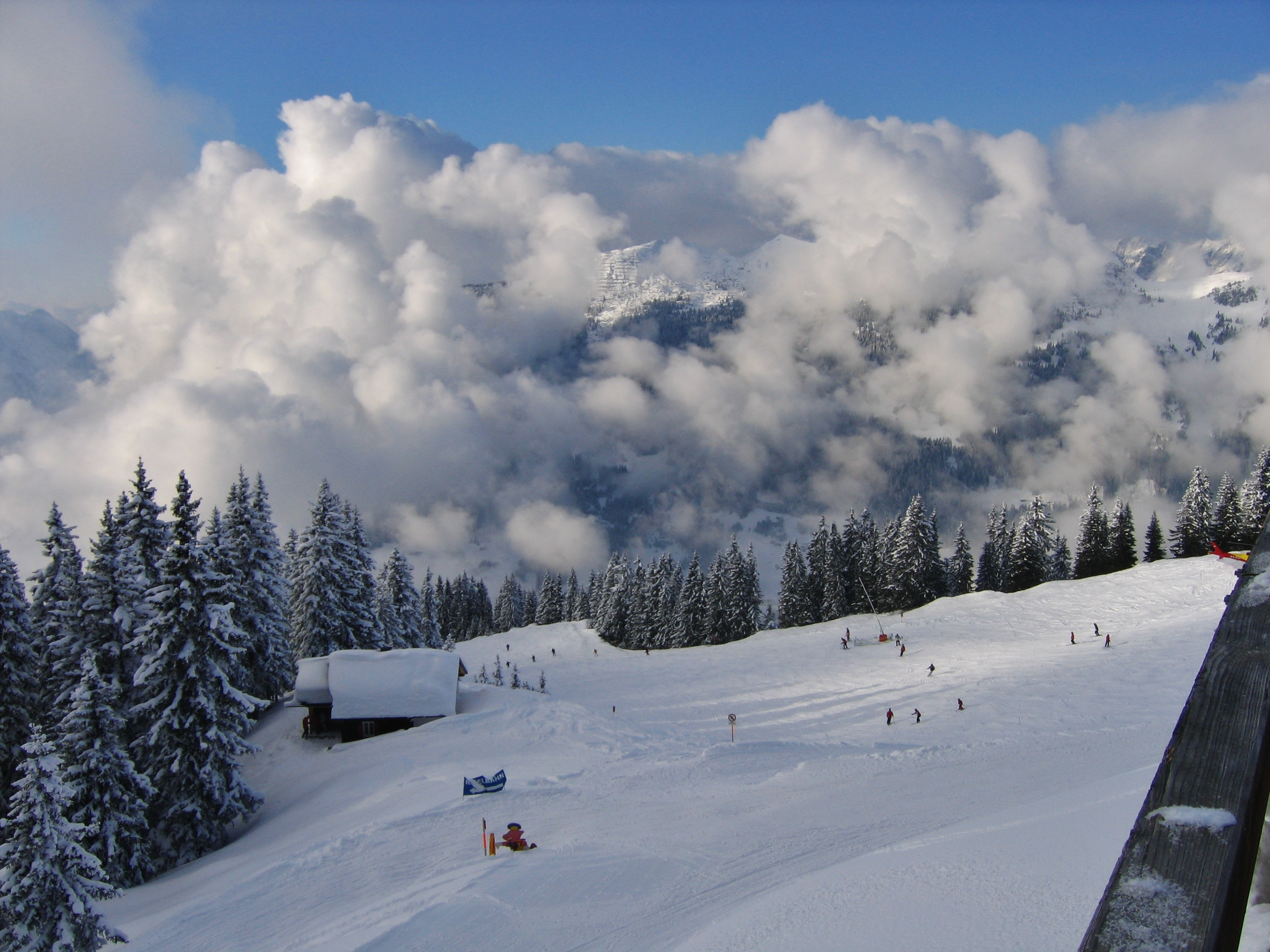
- Interactive map of Silvretta Montafon
- Location: Vorarlberg, Austria
- Nearest city: Schruns, Bludenz
- Coordinates: 46.9809°N 9.9658°E
- Top elevation: 2,430 m (7,970 ft)
- Base elevation: 700 m (2,300 ft)
- Skiable area: 141 km
- Lift system: 10 cable cars; 18 chairlifts; 5 drag lifts
- Website: https://www.silvretta-montafon.at/en

The Silvretta Montafon ski area is located in the Montafon valley in Vorarlberg (Austria). It is one of Austria's ten largest ski areas.

== Geography ==
The Silvretta Montafon ski area is located in the south of Vorarlberg, the westernmost province of Austria, and extends over 17 km and 1,700 meters in altitude from Schruns via Silbertal and St. Gallenkirch to Gaschurn. It lies in the Montafon valley, framed by the Rätikon, Silvretta and Verwall mountain ranges.

The Nova part stretches along the northern flank of the Silvretta Group, the Hochjoch part on a foothill of the Verwall Group, between which the Montafon runs to the south. The valley covers 1/5 of Vorarlberg's area and is larger (562 km^{2}) than Austria's capital city Vienna (415 km^{2}).

The Silvretta Montafon ski area originally consisted of the two ski areas Silvretta Nova (St. Gallenkirch, Gaschurn) and Hochjoch (Schruns, Silbertal), however these merged in 2008.

The region is about 40 minutes by car from Feldkirch in the Rhine Valley, south of the district capital Bludenz.

== Lifts and slopes ==
The height of the area extends from 700 m to 2,430 m. The ski area offers 141 km of certified pistes over 50% of which are at over 2,000 meters. These 141 km consist of 27 easy pistes (60 km), 24 pistes of medium difficulty (45 km), 8 difficult pistes (8 km) and 28 km free ride routes. Skiers can improve their racing skills on two speed measurement tracks. Additionally, there are 8 km of winter hiking trails.

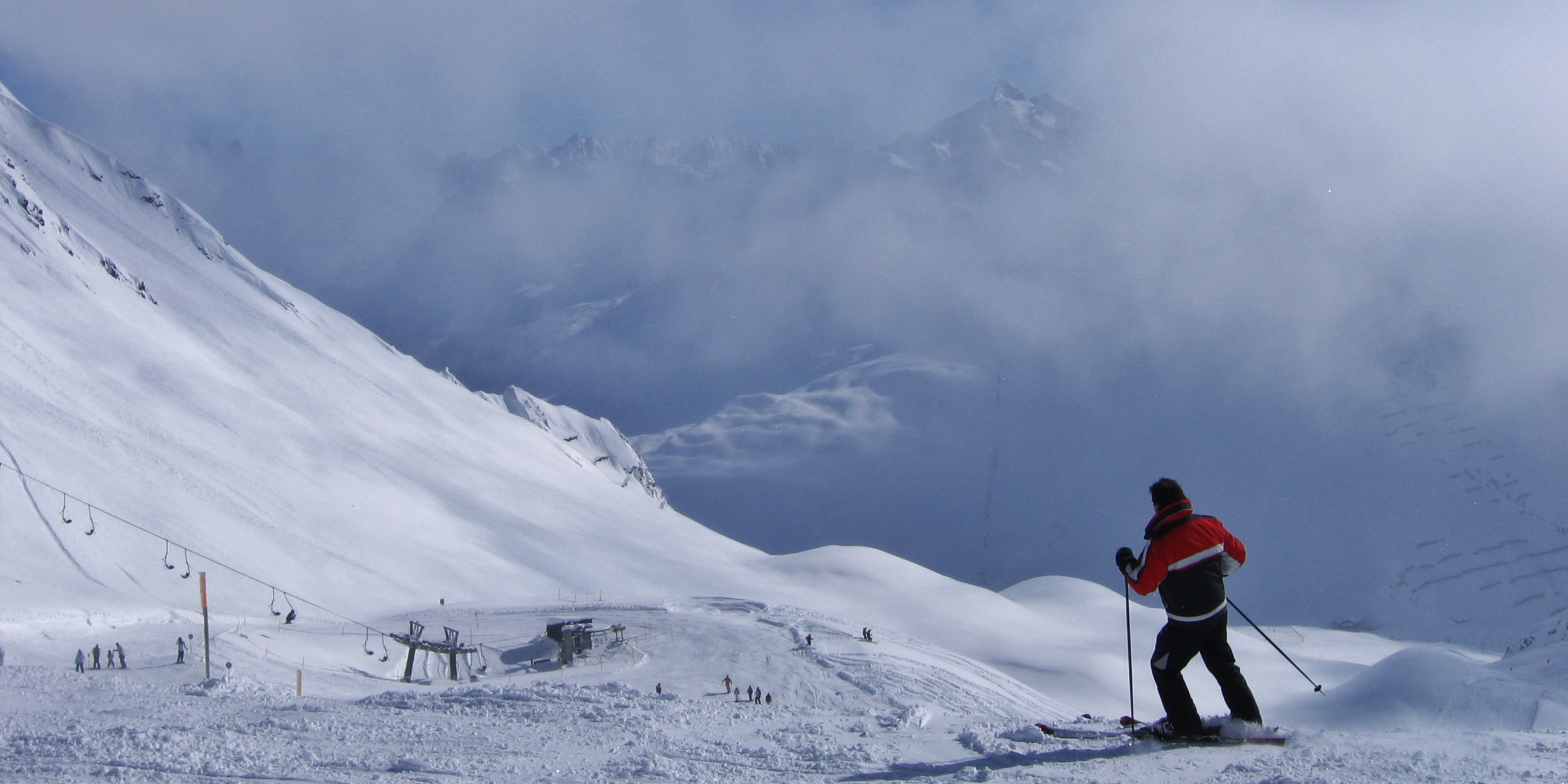
On a piste in the ski area Silvretta Montafon

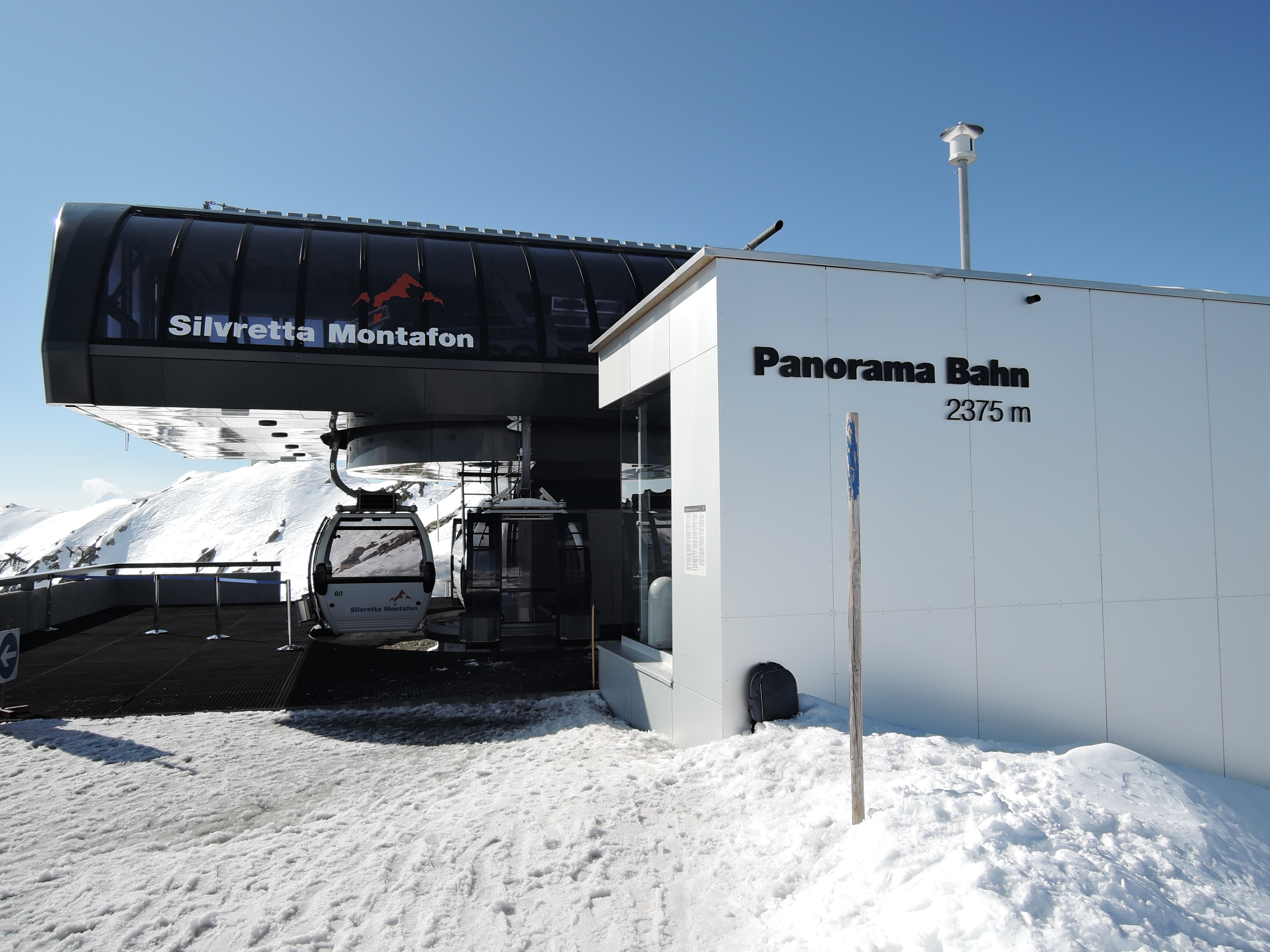
The mountain station of the gondola lift "Panorama Bahn" in the Silvretta Montafon area

The 35 lifts of the ski area include 10 gondola lifts, 18 chair lifts and 5 T-bar lifts, 2 magic carpets, 15 ski school lifts and 7 of them feeder lifts:

- the Hochjochbahn (cable car) and Zamangbahn (6-person gondola) in Schruns,
- the Valiserabahn (6-seater gondola) and Grasjochbahn (8-seater gondola) in St. Gallenkirch,
- the Garfreschabahn (2-seater chairlift) in Gortipohl,
- the Versettlabahn (6-person gondola) in Gaschurn and
- the Kapellbahn (2-seater chairlift) in Silbertal.

The lift capacity in the entire ski area is 65,882 people per hour.

=== Snowpark Montafon ===
The Snowpark Montafon is situated at 2,050 m sea level, its surface covers 300,000 m^{2}. The fun park includes 40 obstacles and elements such as a boardercross, a funslope, jumps, corners, boxes, rails and wave rides.

=== Cross-country skiing ===
The Silvretta Montafon offers 37 classic cross-country ski-runs (72.5 km), 13 skating courses (20.9 km), as well as 7 high cross-country skiing routes (31.3 km).

=== Sledding ===
There are two toboggan runs which are floodlit for night-time tobogganing. From St. Gallenkirch, you can take the Garfrescha Bahn to the illuminated toboggan run in the evening. The length of the toboggan ride is about 20 minutes over a length of 5.5 km.

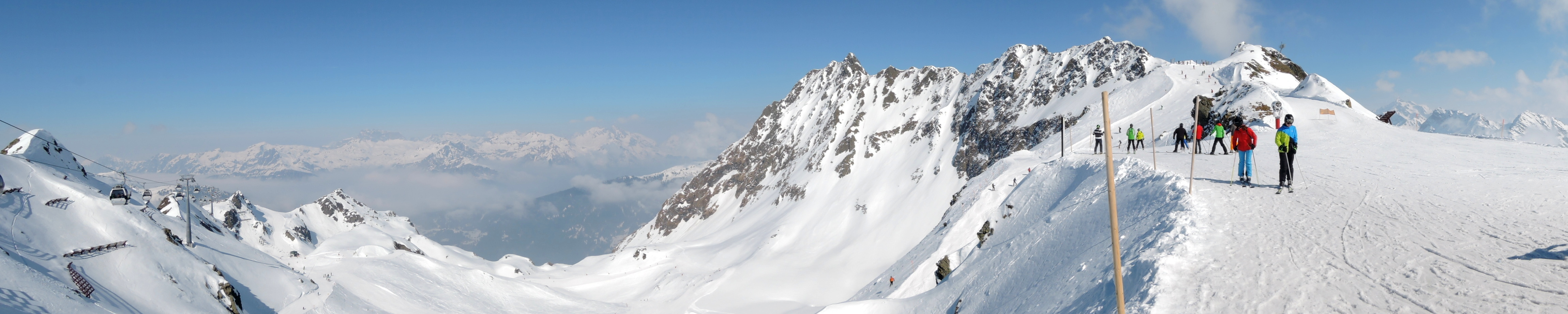
Panoramic photo from the mountain station of the "Panorama Bahn" in the Silvretta Montafon ski area

== Races in the Silvretta Montafon ==
=== FIS Snowboard World Cup ===
The SBX World Cup Montafon is part of the FIS Snowboard World Cup since 2012/13. It takes place annually in December. The races are held in the Silvretta Montafon ski area, starting a little below the Hochjoch summit and finishing near the cable car's mountain station. The difference in altitude between start and finish is around 200 m.

The snowboard-cross athletes race down the 985 m long World Cup track at speeds of up to 65 km/h. The descent doesn't take more than 60 seconds. The parallel slalom course however is 280 m long.

During the SBX World Cup, visitors can watch the snowboarders and skiers during the day time and enjoy concerts in Schruns in the night time.

==== Chronology of Snowboard World Cup races in the Montafon valley ====
- 2021/22: from 9–11 Dec 2021
- 2020/21: Due to policies to fight COVID-19, all races in the Montafon valley (FIS Ski Cross Weltcup, FIS Snowboard Cross World Cup) had to be postponed to 15 and 16 January 2021, and later be cancelled completely.
- 2019/20: snowboard cross (men/ladies) on 13 Dec 2019
- 2018/19: In December 2018, all races of the Montafon World Cup had to be cancelled due to lack of snow.
- 2017/18: snowboard cross (men/ladies), team snowboard cross (men/ladies) on 16 Dec 2017
- 2016/17: snowboard cross (men/ladies) on 16 Dec 2016, team snowboard cross (men/ladies) on 18 Dec 2016
- 2015/16: snowboard cross (men/ladies) on 12 Dec 2015, team events (men/ladies) on 13 Dec 2015
- 2014/15: parallel slalom (men/ladies) on 18 Dec 2014, team events (men/ladies) on 19 Dec 2014
- 2013/14: snowboard cross (men/ladies) on 7 Dec 2013, team events (men/ladies) on 8 Dec 2013
- 2012/13: snowboard cross (men/ladies) on 7 Dec 2012, team events (men/ladies) on 8 Dec 2012

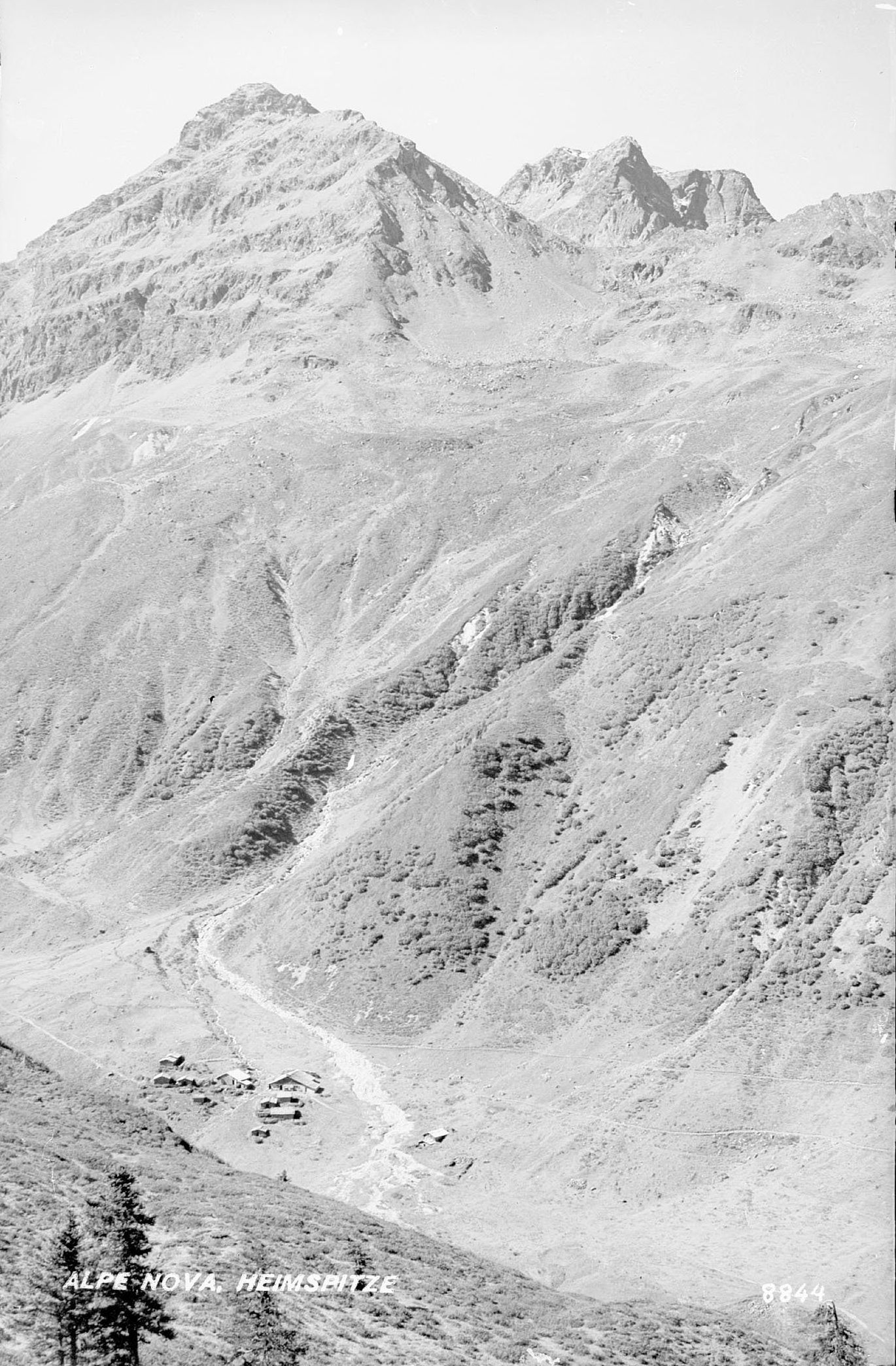
Heimspitze mountain top

=== Open Faces Freeride Contest ===
The first Open Faces Freeride Contest took place in 2017. The last contest was held from 24 to 27 February 2022 in the Silvretta Montafon ski area. The contest was the first 4-star qualifier of the season 2022. The Open Faces venue is the terrain around the "Kleine Heimspitze" at an elevation of about 2,420 m. The length of the freeride slope is 450 m, its vertical drop is 350 m and it has a steepness of up to 60°.

At the first 4-star qualifier of the season 2022 in Montafon, the riders competed for 2,500 victory points and prize money. The public could watch the runs of the riders from the mountain restaurant "Nova Stoba".

== Photo gallery ==
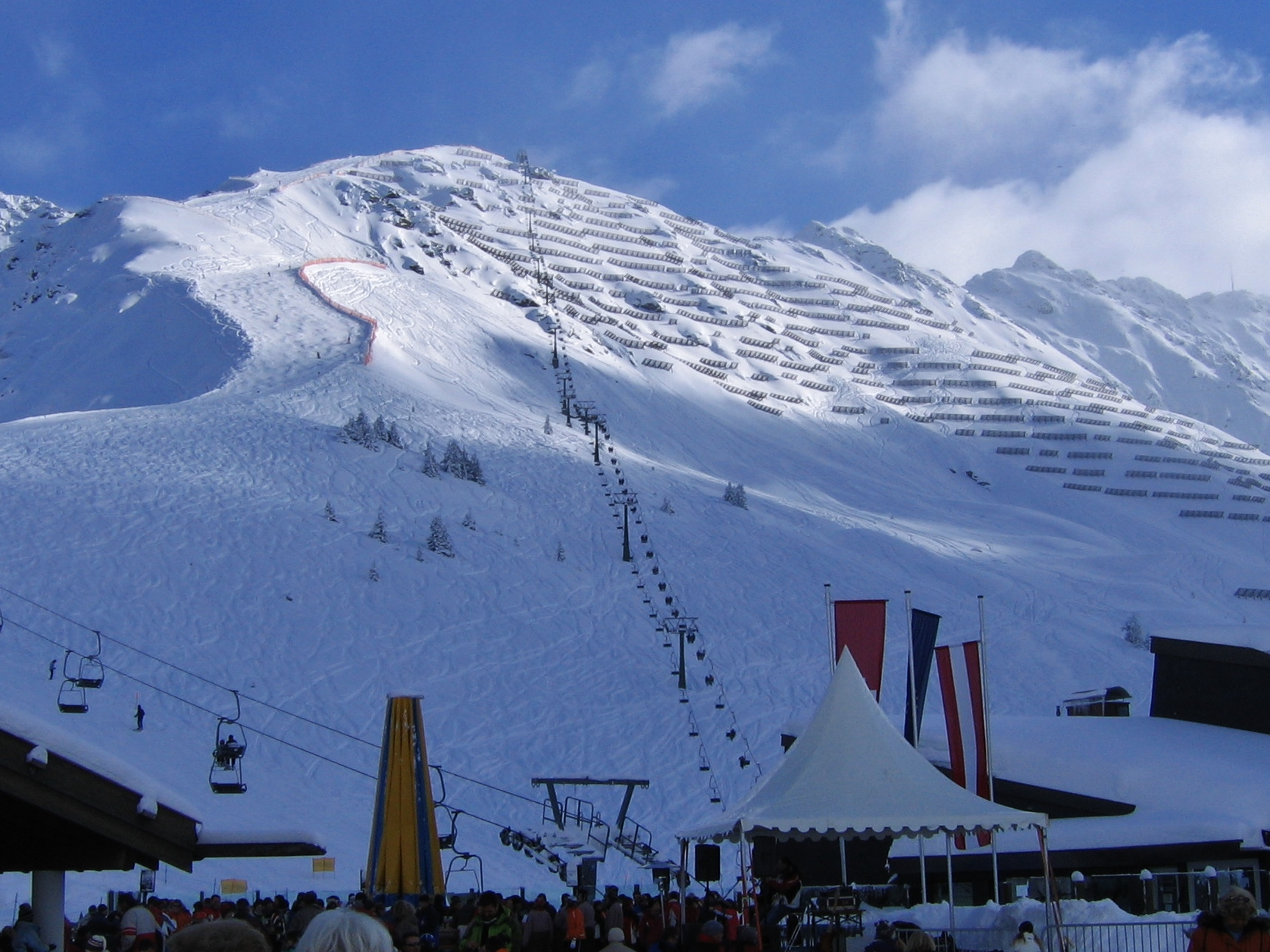
Vorderkapell in the ski area Silvretta Montafon

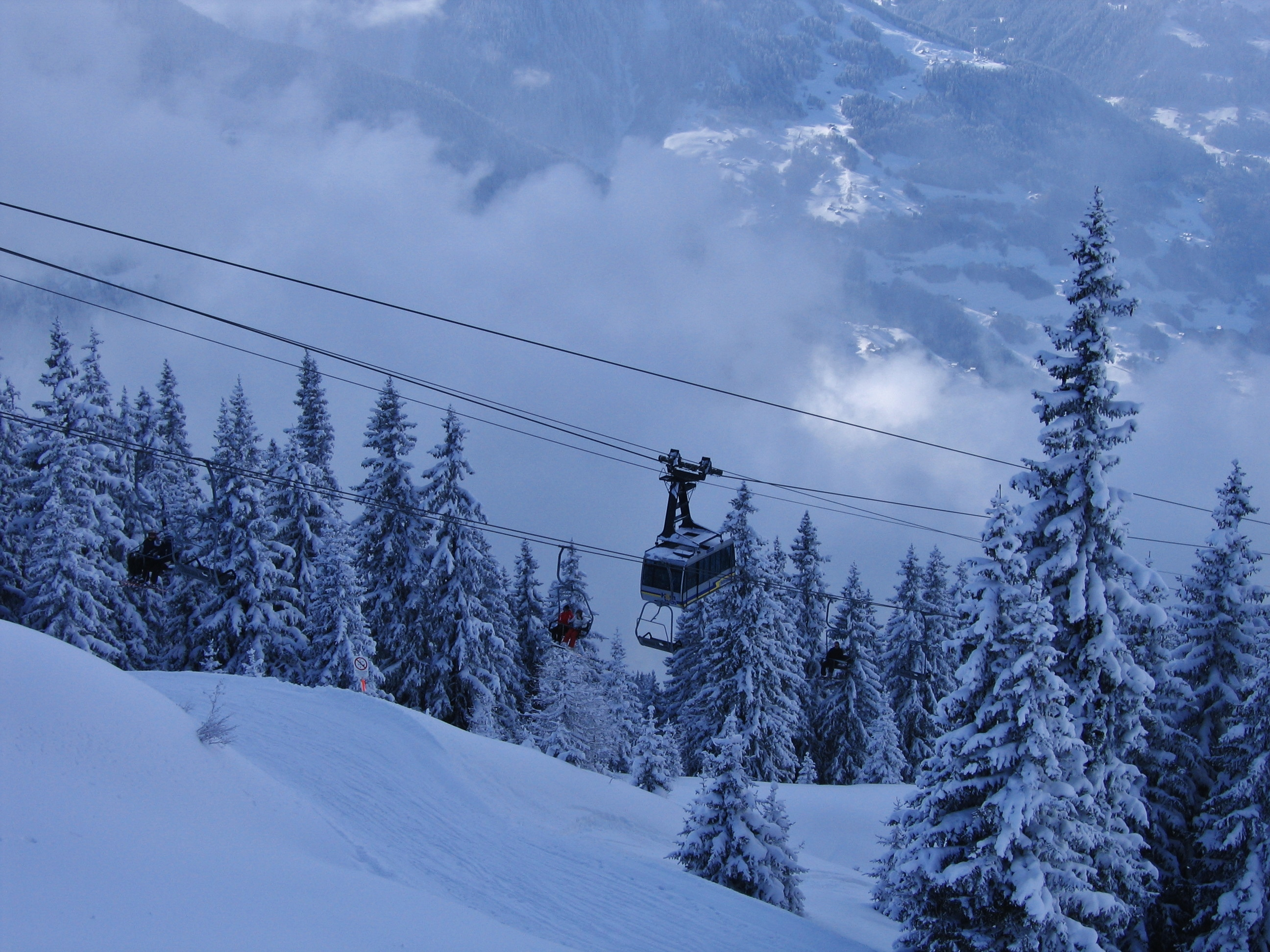
A gondola lift in the Silvretta Montafon

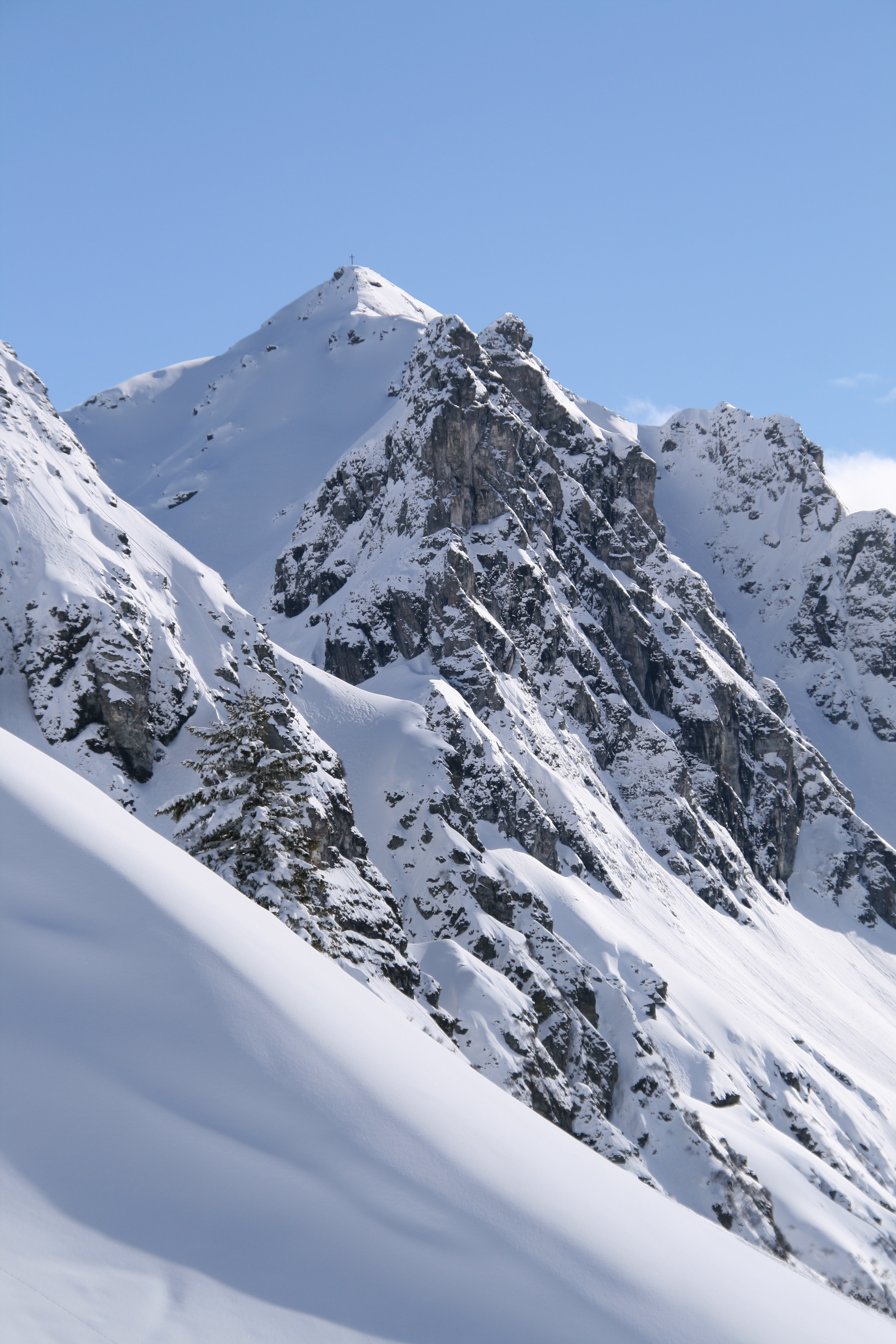
View from the Nova Stoba hut to the Valisera mountain (2,716 m) of the western silvretta in the Montafon

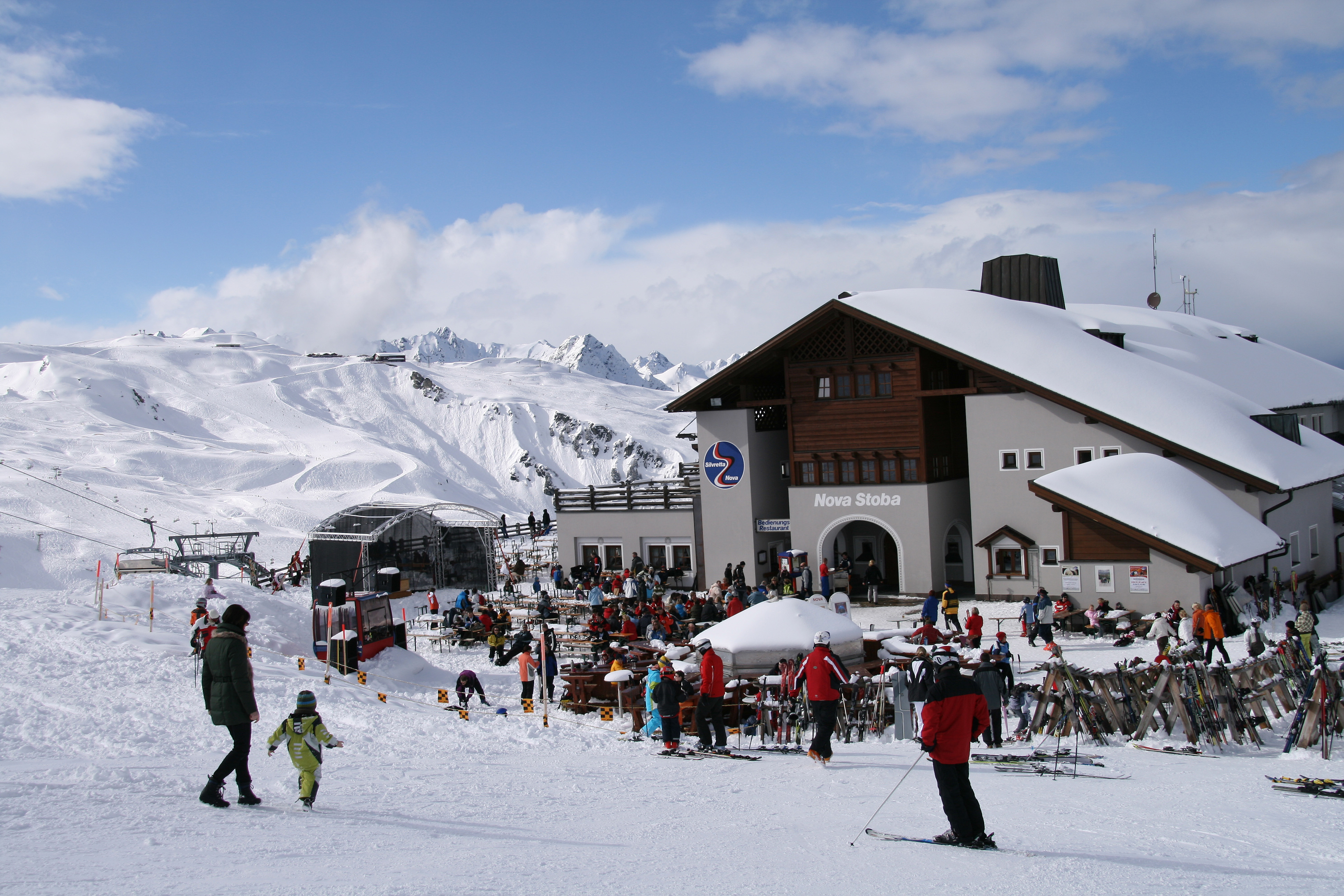
The ski hut "Nova Stoba"

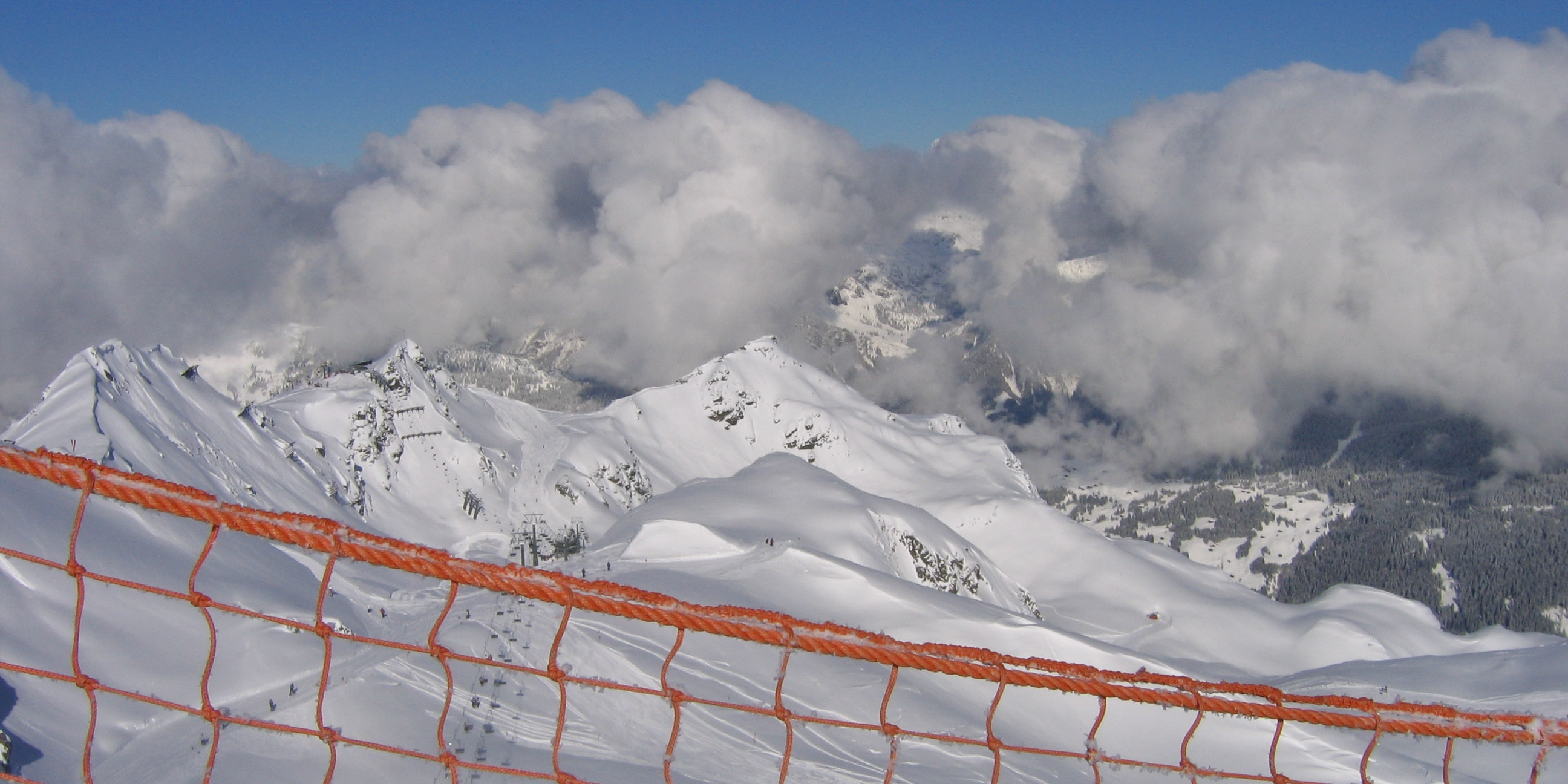
View in the ski area

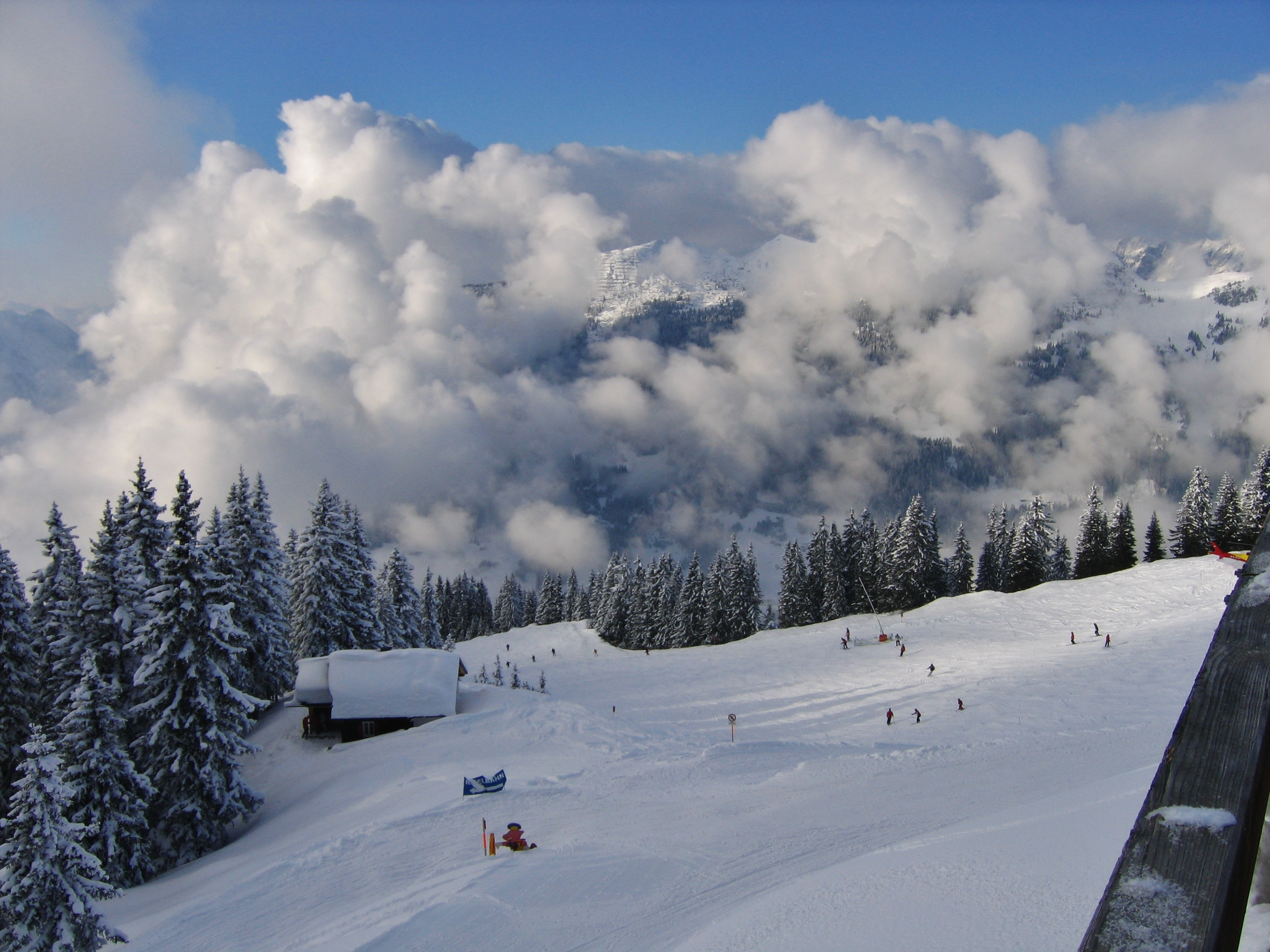
View of a slope of the ski area

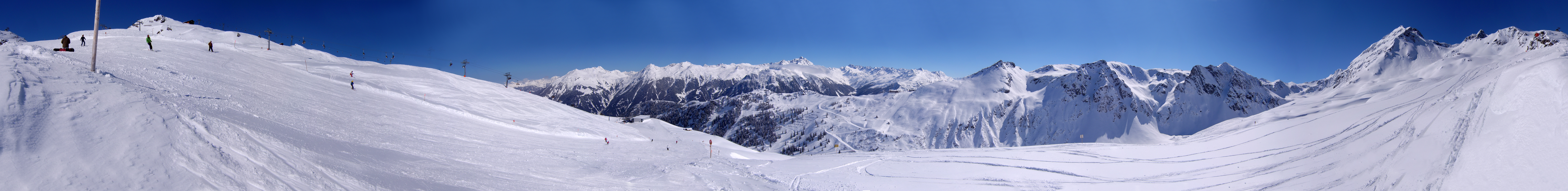
Panoramic view of the Silvretta Nova
