= 2015 European Youth Olympic Winter Festival =

2015 edition of the European Youth Olympic Winter Festival

- Host city: Vorarlberg and Liechtenstein
- Country: Austria; Liechtenstein
- Motto: Rock the Alps !
- Nations: 45
- Athletes: 1,509
- Sport: 8
- Events: 30
- Opening: 25 January 2015
- Closing: 30 January 2015
- Opened by: Heinz Fischer (Austria) and Alois of Liechtenstein
- Athlete's Oath: Xaver Kuster
- Judge's Oath: Marion Vettori
- Torch lighter: Chiara
- Main venue: Montafon Nordic Sportszentrum

Summer

Winter

The 2015 European Youth Olympic Winter Festival was held in Vorarlberg, Austria and Liechtenstein between 25 and 30 January 2015. It was the first time that two countries become hosts in a European Youth Olympic Festival.

== Sports ==
2015 European Youth Olympic Winter Festival Sports Programme
- Alpine skiing (5)
- Biathlon (5)
- Cross-country skiing (7)
- Figure skating (2)
- Ice hockey (1)
- Nordic combined (3)
- Ski jumping (4)
- Snowboarding (3)

== Mascot ==
Alpy the marmot is the mascot for 2015 European Youth Olympic Winter Festival.

== Venues ==
The venues are divided between places in the Vorarlberg region of Austria and in Liechtenstein.
Venues in Austria:

Venue	Location	Sports
Aktivpark Montafon	Tschagguns	Ice hockey
Gaschurn	Gemeinde Gaschurn-Partenen	Nordic combined
Messestadion Dornbirn	Dornbirn	Figure skating
Montafon Nordic Sportszentrum	Tschagguns	Ski jumping, Nordic combined
Tschengla	Bürserberg	Biathlon
Garfrescha	St. Gallenkirch	Alpine skiing
„Hochjoch“ ski area	Schruns	Snowboarding

Venues in Liechtenstein:

Venue	Location	Sports
Bergbahnen Malbun	Malbun	Alpine skiing
Steg	Steg	Cross country skiing

== Schedule ==
The competition schedule for the 2015 European Youth Olympic Winter Festival is as follows:

OC	Opening ceremony	1	Event finals	CC	Closing ceremony	●	Event competitions

January	25 Sun	26 Mon	27 Tue	28 Wed	29 Thu	30 Fri	Events
Ceremonies	OC					CC	
Alpine skiing		1	1	1	1	1	5
Biathlon			2	2		1	5
Cross-country skiing		2		2	2	1	7
Figure skating		●		2			2
Ice hockey		●	●	●	●	1	1
Nordic combined		1		1		1	3
Ski jumping			2		1	1	4
Snowboarding			2		1		3
Total events		4	7	8	5	6	30
Cumulative total		4	11	19	24	30	
January	25 Sun	26 Mon	27 Tue	28 Wed	29 Thu	30 Fri	Events

== Opening ceremony ==
The opening ceremony for 2015 European Youth Olympic Winter Festival took place on 25 January in Montafon Nordic Sportszentrum in Tschagguns, Austria. Featuring about 150 amateur performers, the show focused about the close relation between the two co-hosts. The ceremony started with the parade of athletes from 45 countries, with the team from Austria and Liechtenstein marched together at the end of the parade. Carmen Wyler (Liechtenstein) and Thomas Pegram (Austria) then sang the national anthems of the hosts. After the speeches from ÖOC Secretary General Peter Mennel and EOC President Patrick Hickey, the Games were officially opened together by Heinz Fischer, President of Austria and Alois, Hereditary Prince of Liechtenstein. Then, Xaver Kuster, an Austrian snowboarder took the athletes' oath, followed by Marion Vettori for the judges' oath and Ralf Jegler (alpine skiing coach of Liechtenstein) for the coaches' oath.

== Medal table ==
Russia topped the medal standings with 6 golds, 6 silvers, and four bronzes. Meanwhile, Germany had the highest medal count with 20.

* Host nations (Austria, Liechtenstein)

Rank	Nation	Gold	Silver	Bronze	Total
1	Russia (RUS)	6	6	4	16
2	Germany (GER)	6	4	10	20
3	Austria (AUT)*	5	5	3	13
4	Norway (NOR)	4	4	3	11
5	France (FRA)	4	2	5	11
6	Finland (FIN)	1	2	1	4
7	Slovenia (SLO)	1	1	0	2
7	Sweden (SWE)	1	1	0	2
9	Croatia (CRO)	1	0	0	1
9	Ukraine (UKR)	1	0	0	1
11	Bulgaria (BUL)	0	2	0	2
12	Czech Republic (CZE)	0	1	1	2
13	Italy (ITA)	0	1	0	1
13	Latvia (LAT)	0	1	0	1
15	Switzerland (SUI)	0	0	3	3
16	Belgium (BEL)	0	0	1	1
16	Poland (POL)	0	0	1	1
Totals (17 entries)		30	30	32	92
