= Alpine skiing at the 2015 European Youth Olympic Winter Festival =

- Venue: Garfrescha, St. Gallenkirch, Austria; Bergbahnen Malbun, Malbun, Liechtenstein
- Date: 18–22 February

Alpine skiing at the 2015 European Youth Olympic Winter Festival was held between 26 and 30 January 2015. Boys' and girls' events were held in Malbun, Liechtenstein, while the mixed event was held in St. Gallenkirch, Austria.

== Medal summary ==
| Event | Gold | | Silver | | Bronze | |
|---|---|---|---|---|---|---|
| Boys' giant slalom | Pascal Fritz (AUT) | 1:42.79 | Albert Popov (BUL) | 1:43.07 | Armand Marchant (BEL) | 1:43.21 |
| Boys' slalom | Raphael Haaser (AUT) | 1:28.05 | Albert Popov (BUL) | 1:29.51 | Adrian Meisen (GER) | 1:29.75 |
| Girls' giant slalom | Romane Geraci (FRA) | 1:49.20 | Laura Pirovano (ITA) | 1:49.53 | Katharina Liensberger (AUT); Mélanie Meillard (SUI) | 1:49.98 |
| Girls' slalom | Leona Popović (CRO) | 1:33.67 | Katharina Gallhuber (AUT) | 1:34.20 | Aline Danioth (SUI) | 1:34.45 |
| Mixed parallel team | Austria (AUT); Franziska Gritsch; Katharina Liensberger; Julia Scheib; Pascal Fritz; Fabio Gstrein; Raphael Haaser | | Norway (NOR); Marte Edseth Berg; Vilde Brakestad; Kajsa Vickhoff Lie; Odin Vassbotn Breivik; Joachim Jagge Lindstøl; Olav Engelhardt Sanderberg | | Germany (GER); Martina Ostler; Julia Pronnet; Lucia Rispler; Ferdinand Dorsch; Joel Kohler; Adrian Meisen | |

== Medal table ==
| Rank | Nation | Gold | Silver | Bronze | Total |
|---|---|---|---|---|---|
| 1 | Austria (AUT) | 3 | 1 | 1 | 5 |
| 2 | Croatia (CRO) | 1 | 0 | 0 | 1 |
| 2 | France (FRA) | 1 | 0 | 0 | 1 |
| 4 | Bulgaria (BUL) | 0 | 2 | 0 | 2 |
| 5 | Italy (ITA) | 0 | 1 | 0 | 1 |
| 5 | Norway (NOR) | 0 | 1 | 0 | 1 |
| 7 | Germany (GER) | 0 | 0 | 2 | 2 |
| 7 | Switzerland (SUI) | 0 | 0 | 2 | 2 |
| 9 | Belgium (BEL) | 0 | 0 | 1 | 1 |
| Totals (9 entries) | | 5 | 5 | 6 | 16 |
