= FIS Freestyle Ski and Snowboarding World Championships 2027 =

International championships

- Host city: Montafon
- Country: Austria
- Events: 31
- Opening: 6 March 2027
- Closing: 21 March 2027
- Website: Montafon 2027

The 2027 FIS Freestyle Ski and Snowboarding World Championships is set to be held in the Montafon region of Austria from 6 to 21 March 2027.

A total of 31 events is set to be contested with 17 being contested contested in the freestyle and freeski disciplines and 14 in snowboarding. Sankt Gallenkirch is set to host the ski & snowboard cross events, Gargellen the alpine snowboard events, Tschagguns the big air and aerials events. The slopestyle events will take place in the Silvretta Nova ski resort, with the moguls events contested in the Golm ski resort. The halfpipe events will be the only events hosted outside of the Montafon region, they're to be contested in Kühtai, Tyrol.

== Host selection ==
Montafon was awareded host of the 2027 Freestyle Ski and Snowboarding World Championships by being the lone applicant by the end of the application period in October 2021.

== Schedule ==
Q	Qualification	F	Final

Event ↓ / Date →	March																			
Event ↓ / Date →	Sat 06	Sun 07		Mon 08	Tue 09		Wed 10	Thu 11	Fri 12		Sat 13		Sun 14	Mon 15	Tue 16	Wed 17	Thu 18	Fri 19	Sat 20	Sun 21
Freestyle skiing
Ski cross									Q		F									
Ski cross team													F							
Aerials																	Q	F		
Team aerials																			F	
Moguls									Q		F									
Dual moguls														F						
Dual moguls team															F					
Slopestyle																Q^{W}	Q^{M}		F	
Halfpipe		Q			F															
Big air								Q^{M}			Q^{W}	F								
Snowboarding
Snowboard cross																		Q	F	
Snowboard cross team																				F
Parallel giant slalom					Q	F														
Parallel slalom		Q	F																	
Parallel slalom team							F													
Slopestyle															Q^{M}	Q^{W}		F		
Halfpipe	Q			F																
Big air							Q^{M}		Q^{W}	F										
