= Biathlon at the 2015 European Youth Olympic Winter Festival =

Athletic competition

- Venue: Tschengla, Bürserberg
- Date: 27–30 January

Biathlon at the 2015 European Youth Olympic Winter Festival was held from 27 to 30 January 2015 at the Tschengla, Bürserberg, Austria.

== Results ==
=== Medal table ===
Rank	Nation	Gold	Silver	Bronze	Total
1	Russia (RUS)	1	2	1	4
2	Norway (NOR)	1	1	1	3
3	Austria (AUT)	1	1	0	2
3	Sweden (SWE)	1	1	0	2
5	France (FRA)	1	0	1	2
6	Germany (GER)	0	0	2	2
Totals (6 entries)		5	5	5	15

=== Medalists ===
Event	Gold	Silver	Bronze
Boys 10 km	Sebastian Samuelsson; Sweden	Sturla Holm Lægreid; Norway	Aleksander Fjeld Andersen; Norway
Girls 7,5 km	Lou Jeanmonnot; France	Vera Rumyantseva; Russia	Sophia Schneider; Germany
Boys 7,5 km sprint	Sergei Demichev; Russia	Sebastian Samuelsson; Sweden	Igor Malinovskii; Russia
Girls 6 km sprint	Anna-Maria Schreder; Austria	Tamara Steiner; Austria	Emilie Bulle; France
Mixed relay 2x6 km, 2x7,5 km	Norway; Mathea Tofte; Karoline Erdal; Aleksander Fjeld Andersen; Sturla Holm Lægreid	Russia; Vera Rumyantseva; Irina Kazakevich; Nikita Lobastov; Igor Malinovskii	Germany; Melanie Eccarius; Sophia Schneider; Marinus Veit; Tobias Wanninger
