= Nordic combined at the 2015 European Youth Olympic Winter Festival =

- Venue: Montafon Nordic Sportszentrum, Tschagguns; Gaschurn, Gemeinde Gaschurn-Partenen
- Date: 26-30 January

Nordic combined at the 2015 European Youth Olympic Winter Festival was held at the Montafon Nordic Sportszentrum in Tschagguns and in Gaschurn, Gemeinde Gaschurn-Partenen from 26 to 30 January 2015.

== Results ==
=== Medal table ===
Rank	Nation	Gold	Silver	Bronze	Total
1	Germany (GER)	2	1	0	3
2	Austria (AUT)	1	1	1	3
3	Finland (FIN)	0	1	0	1
4	France (FRA)	0	0	2	2
Totals (4 entries)		3	3	3	9

=== Boys events ===
Event	Gold		Silver		Bronze	
Gundersen 5 km	Willi Hengelhaupt; Germany	13:40.9	Samuel Mraz; Austria	14:17.3	Theo Rochat; France	14:25.4
Gundersen 10 km	Willi Hengelhaupt; Germany	27:17.4	Severi Taipale; Finland	27:30.4	Samuel Mraz; Austria	27:34.5
Team 4x5 km	Austria (AUT); Daniel Rieder; Philipp Kuttin; Samuel Mraz; Mika Vermeulen	56:37.3	Germany (GER); Constantin Schnurr; Benedikt Schwaiger; Tim Kopp; Willi Hengelhaupt	56:40.6	France (FRA); Yann Laheurte; Brice Ottonello; Lilian Vaxelaire; Theo Rochat	57:50.7
