= Cross-country skiing at the 2015 European Youth Olympic Winter Festival =

Cross country skiing at the 2015 European Youth Olympic Winter Festival
- Venue: Steg, Liechtenstein
- Date: 26–30 January

Cross-country skiing at the 2015 European Youth Olympic Winter Festival was held at Steg in Liechtenstein from 26 to 30 January 2015.

== Results ==
=== Medal table ===
Rank	Nation	Gold	Silver	Bronze	Total
1	Norway (NOR)	3	2	2	7
2	Russia (RUS)	2	3	1	6
3	Germany (GER)	2	1	3	6
4	France (FRA)	0	1	1	2
Totals (4 entries)		7	7	7	21

=== Boys events ===
Event	Gold		Silver		Bronze	
7,5 km free	Janosch Brugger; Germany	19:06.0	Egor Kararinov; Russia	19:18.9	Petter Stakson; Norway	19:18.9
10 km classic	Petter Stakson; Norway	27:08.9	Herman Martens Meyer; Norway	27:18.0	Janosch Brugger; Germany	27:25.9
Sprint classic	Petter Stakson; Norway		Martin Collet; France		Matis Bouscarra Gaubert; France	

=== Girls events ===
Event	Gold		Silver		Bronze	
5 km free	Antonia Fräbel; Germany	13:46.1	Olga Kutscheruk; Russia	14:01.1	Polina Nekrassowa; Russia	14:03.6
7,5 km classic	Marte Mæhlum Johansen; Norway	23:04.3	Lidija Durkina; Russia	23:08.8	Katherine Sauerbrey; Germany	23:17.6
Sprint classic	Olga Kutscheruk; Russia		Antonia Fräbel; Germany		Martine Lorgen Øvrebust; Norway	

=== Mixed events ===
Event	Gold		Silver		Bronze	
4x5 km relay	Russia (RUS); Alexander Klugen; Lidija Durkina; Jegor Kasarinow; Olga Kutscheruk	55:19.7	Norway (NOR); Petter Stakson; Marte Mæhlum Johansen; Simen Thune Rolfsen; Martine Lorgen Øvrebust	55:30.3	Germany (GER); Jacob Vogt; Katherine Sauerbrey; Janosch Brugger; Antonia Fräbel	56:39.0
