= SBX World Cup Montafon =

Annual snowboard competition in Montafon, Austria

- Status: 2024–03-15 FIS Snowboard World Cup
- Genre: Snowboarding
- Date: March
- Frequency: annual
- Venue: Hochjoch
- Location: Montafon (Vorarlberg)
- Country: Austria
- Inaugurated: 2012/13
- Organiser: International Ski Federation

The SBX World Cup Montafon is a snowboard competition that takes place annually in Montafon in Vorarlberg (Austria) as part of the FIS Snowboard World Cup.

The competitions are held at Hochjoch in Schruns in the Silvretta Montafon ski area. The following disciplines have been carried out in Montafon so far: snowboard cross (SBX) and parallel slalom (PSL). The snowboard cross route is 980 meters long and the parallel slalom route is 280 meters long.

== History ==
Snowboarding was added to the FIS competition program in May 1994. The first Snowboard World Championship was held in 1996.

In the 2010/11 season, the Snowboard Cross World Cup was held in Lech am Arlberg, before it continued to be held in Montafon. There, the first Snowboard Cross World Cup took place in December 2012.

In December 2014, the snowboard cross had to be cancelled due to warm temperatures. Instead, a parallel slalom and mixed team competition were held. In 2018, snow production was impossible for the track, due to warm temperatures once again, so that year the snowboard cross had to be cancelled.

In the season 2020/21, due to policies regarding COVID-19, all races in Montafon (FIS Ski Cross Weltcup, FIS Snowboard Cross World Cup) had to be postponed to 15 and 16 January 2021, and later be cancelled completely.

== Standings ==
=== Women ===
Season	Discipline	Winner	Second	Third
2012/13	Snowboard Cross	Canada	Italy	Australia
2012/13	Snowboard Cross Team	Austria	United States	France
2013/14	Snowboard Cross	Czech Republic	Canada	Norway
2013/14	Snowboard Cross Team	Italy	Canada	France
2014/15	Snowboard Cross	Cancelled		
2014/15	Snowboard Cross Team	Cancelled		
2014/15	Parallel slalom	Austria	Germany	Russia
2015/16	Snowboard Cross	France	United States	Russia
2015/16	Snowboard Cross Team	France I	United States I	Switzerland I
2016/17	Snowboard Cross	Australia	France	United States
2016/17	Snowboard Cross Team	France I	Italy I	France II
2017/18	Snowboard Cross	Italy	United States	France
2017/18	Snowboard Cross Team	France I (Chloé Trespeuch/Nelly Moenne-Loccoz)	Canada I (Meryeta Odine/Zoe Bergermann)	Russia I (Kristina Iossifowna Paul/Marija Jewgenjewna Wassilzowa)
2018/19	Snowboard Cross	Cancelled		
2018/19	Snowboard Cross Team	Cancelled		
2019/20	Snowboard Cross	Czech Republic	Italy	Australia
2021	Snowboard Cross	United Kingdom	Australia	France
2022/2023	Snowboard Cross	Cancelled		

=== Men ===
Season	Discipline	Winner	Second	Third
2012/13	Snowboard Cross	Italy	Austria	United States
2012/13	Snowboard Cross Team	United States II	United States	Italy
2013/14	Snowboard Cross	Austria	Italy	Canada
2013/14	Snowboard Cross Team	Italy II	Germany	Norway
2014/15	Snowboard Cross	Cancelled		
2014/15	Snowboard Cross Team	Cancelled		
2014/15	Parallel slalom	Italy	Slovenia	Italy
2015/16	Snowboard Cross	Austria	Austria	Russia
2015/16	Snowboard Cross Team	France I	Italy II	Switzerland I
2016/17	Snowboard Cross	United States	Italy	Australia
2016/17	Snowboard Cross Team	Spain I	Italy I	United States II
2017/18	Snowboard Cross	Australia	Austria	Austria
2017/18	Snowboard Cross Team	Spain I (Regino Hernández/Lucas Eguibar)	Austria I (Alessandro Hämmerle/Markus Schairer)	France I (Merlin Surget/Pierre Vaultier)
2018/19	Snowboard Cross	Cancelled		
2018/19	Snowboard Cross Team	Cancelled		
2019/20	Snowboard Cross	Austria	Australia	Italy
2021	Snowboard Cross	Austria	United States	Germany
2022/2023	Snowboard Cross	Cancelled		

=== Team ===
Season	Discipline	Winner	Second	Third
2014/15	Parallel slalom, mixed (men/women)	Italy	Russia II	Japan
