= Snowboarding at the 2015 European Youth Olympic Winter Festival =

- Venue: „Hochjoch“ ski area, Schruns
- Date: 27–29 January

Snowboarding at the 2015 European Youth Olympic Winter Festival was held at the „Hochjoch“ ski area in Schruns, Austria from 27 to 29 January 2015.

== Medal table ==
Rank	Nation	Gold	Silver	Bronze	Total
1	France (FRA)	2	1	0	3
2	Germany (GER)	1	0	1	2
3	Austria (AUT)	0	2	0	2
4	Russia (RUS)	0	0	1	1
4	Switzerland (SUI)	0	0	1	1
Totals (5 entries)		3	3	3	9

== Boys events ==
Event	Gold	Silver	Bronze
Snowboard cross	Merlin Surget; France	Fabian Hartmann; Austria	Leon Beckhaus; Germany

== Girls events ==
Event	Gold	Silver	Bronze
Snowboard cross	Sarah Dienstbeck; Germany	Marie Marguet; France	Kristina Paul; Russia

== Mixed events ==
Event	Gold	Silver	Bronze
Snowboard cross	Manon Petit; France; Merlin Surget; France	Pia Zerkhold; Austria; Andreas Kroh; Austria	Sophie Hediger; Switzerland; Pascal Bitschnau; Switzerland
