= Hochjoch =

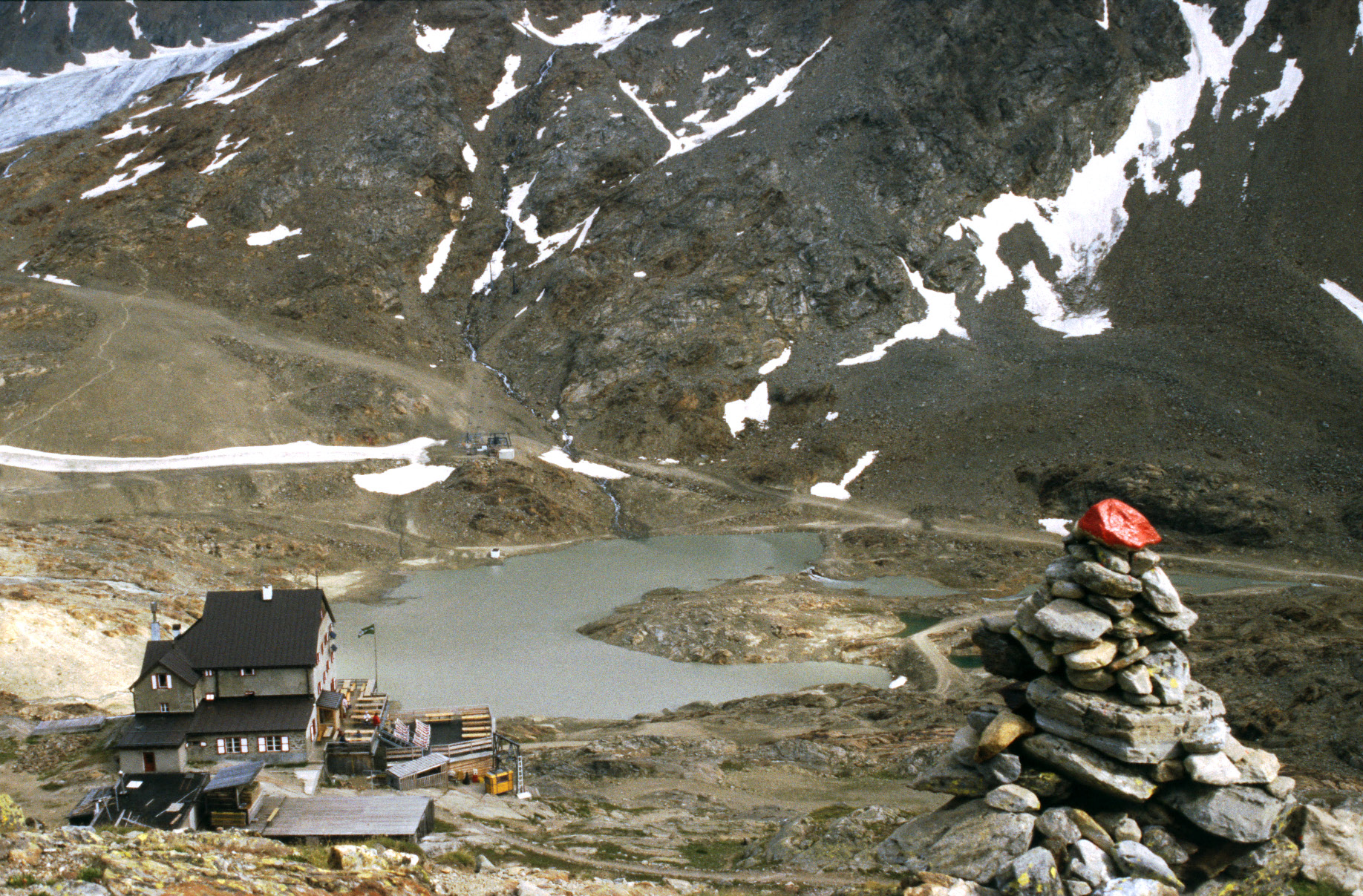
- Schöne-Aussicht-Hütte (Rifugio Bellavista)

- Location within Austria
- Elevation: 2,875 metres (9,432 ft)

Third Approach
- Location: Austria–Italy border
- Range: Ötztal Alps
- Coordinates: 46°47′17″N 10°47′58″E

The Hochjoch (elevation 2,875 m, 9,432 ft) is a mountain pass in the Ötztal Alps on the border between Tyrol, Austria, and South Tyrol, Italy. Located between the Venter and Schnalser valleys, the Hochjoch is covered by the Hochjoch-Ferner glacier.
