= Bürserberg =

- Municipality
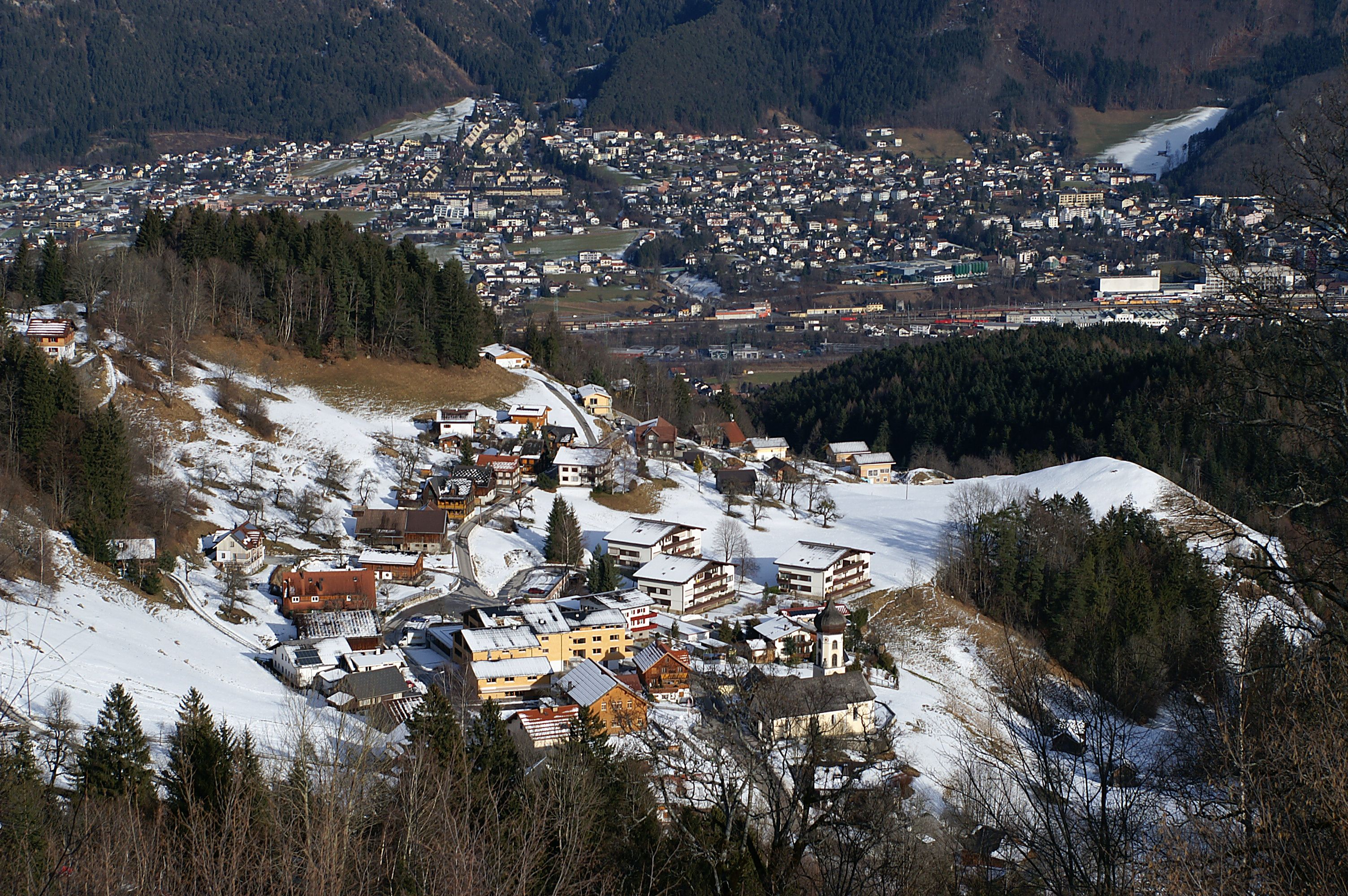

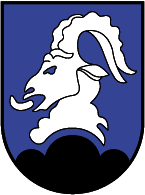
- Coat of arms

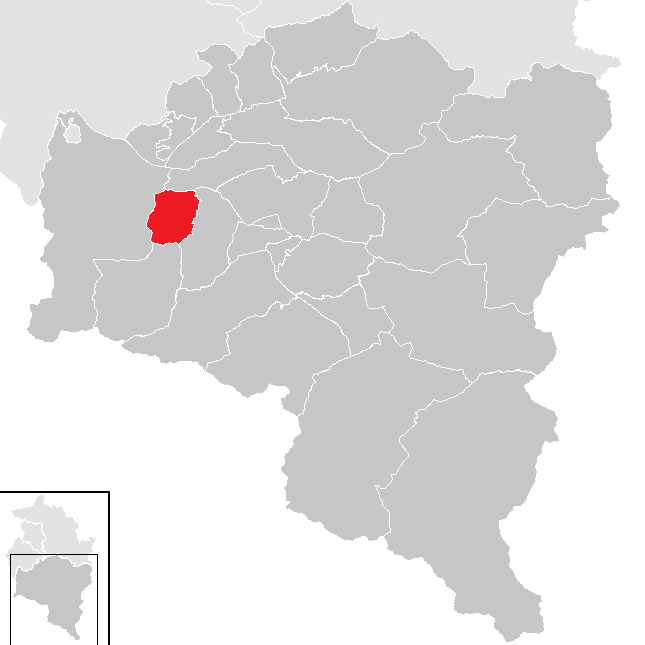
- Location in the district

- Location within Austria
- Coordinates: 47°08′00″N 09°46′00″E
- Country: Austria
- State: Vorarlberg
- District: Bludenz

Government
  - Mayor: Fridolin Plaickner

Area
  - Total: 13.73 km^{2} (5.30 sq mi)
- Elevation: 871 m (2,858 ft)

Population (2018-01-01)
  - Total: 572
  - Density: 41.7/km^{2} (108/sq mi)
- Time zone: UTC+1 (CET)
  - Summer (DST): UTC+2 (CEST)
- Postal code: 6707
- Area code: 05552
- Vehicle registration: BZ
- Website: www.buerserberg.at

Bürserberg is a municipality in Austria in Vorarlberg in the Bludenz district with 549 inhabitants (as of January 1, 2020).

== Population ==
Historical population
Year	Pop.	±%
1869	431	—
1880	451	+4.6%
1890	425	−5.8%
1900	393	−7.5%
1910	413	+5.1%
1923	385	−6.8%
1934	437	+13.5%
1939	415	−5.0%
1951	447	+7.7%
1961	447	+0.0%
1971	473	+5.8%
1981	479	+1.3%
2001	530	+10.6%
2011	523	−1.3%
