= Gemeinde Gaschurn-Partenen =

Gaschurn-Partenen
- Municipality
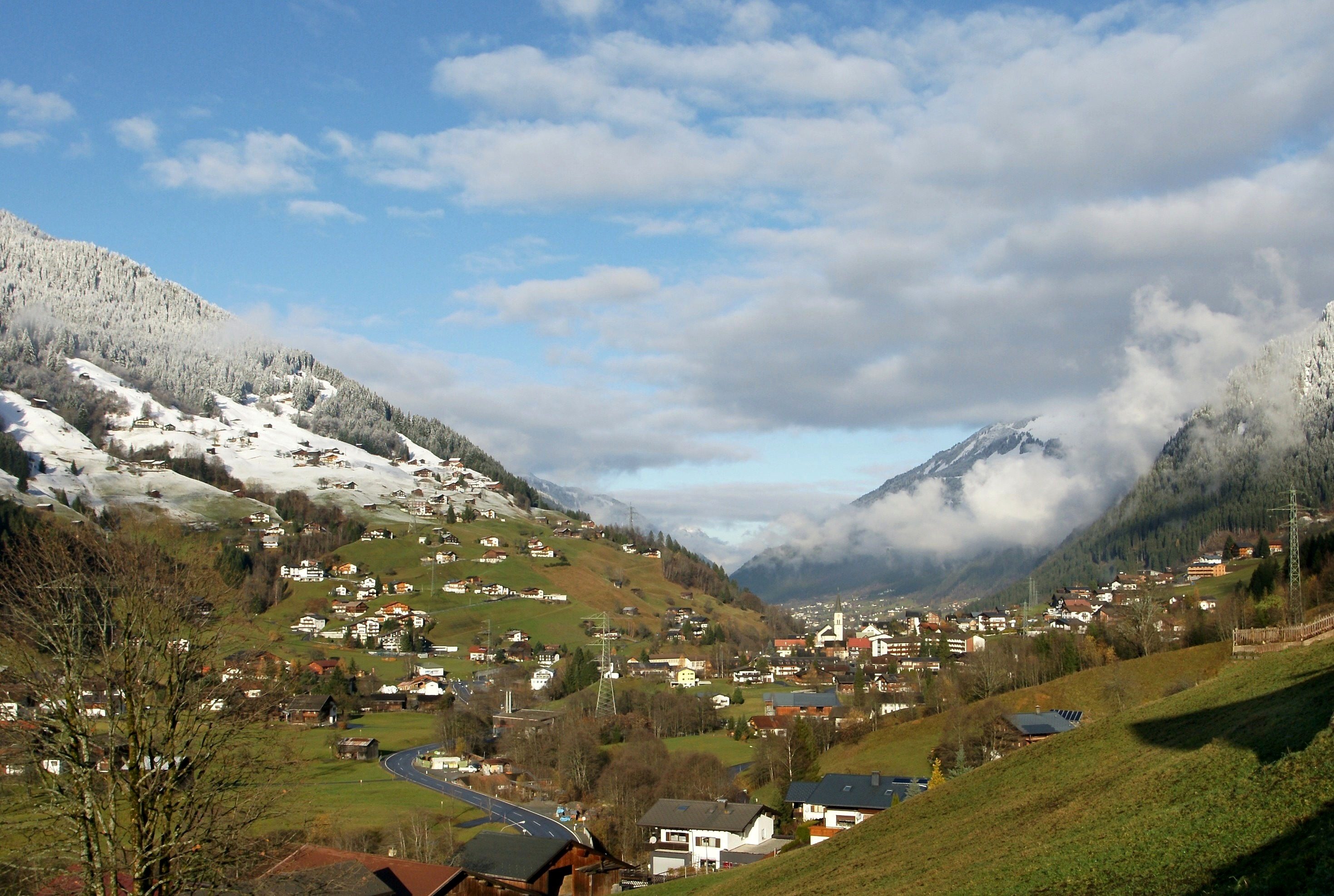

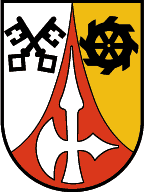
- Coat of arms

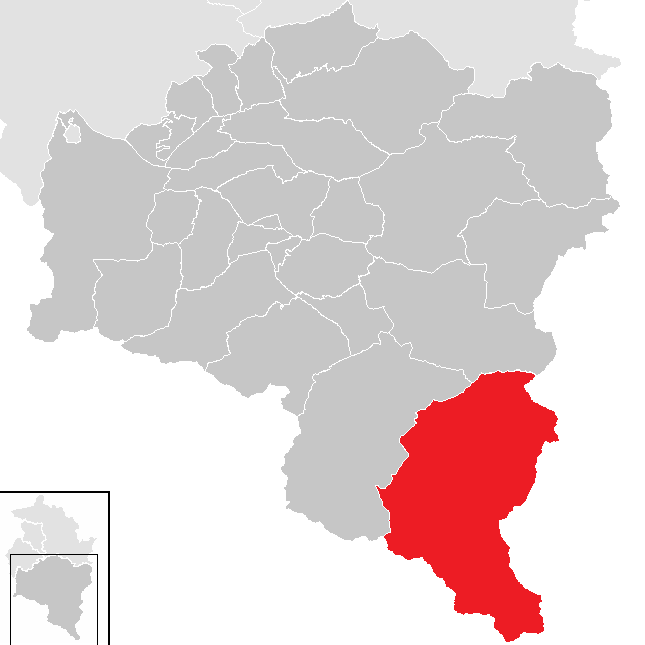
- Location in the district

- Location within Austria
- Coordinates: 46°58′00″N 10°01′00″E
- Country: Austria
- State: Vorarlberg
- District: Bludenz

Government
  - Mayor: Daniel Sandrell

Area
  - Total: 176.78 km^{2} (68.26 sq mi)
- Elevation: 979 m (3,212 ft)

Population (2018-01-01)
  - Total: 1,464
  - Density: 8.281/km^{2} (21.45/sq mi)
- Time zone: UTC+1 (CET)
  - Summer (DST): UTC+2 (CEST)
- Postal code: 6793
- Area code: 05558
- Vehicle registration: BZ
- Website: www.riskommunal.net/ gaschurn

Gaschurn-Partenen is a municipality in the district of Bludenz in the westernmost Austrian state of Vorarlberg. The two largest villages are Gaschurn Dorf (population 1083 as of 1.1.2020) and Partenen (population 376 as of 1.1.2020).

== Geography ==
The center of Gaschurn lies 979 m above sea level. It is located in the Montafon valley between Gortipohl and Partenen (the latter belonging to the municipality of Gaschurn). 12.7 percent of the municipal area is forested, and 51.7 percent are alpine.

The river Ill runs through the community. On the right are the Verwall mountains, and on the left the Silvretta mountain range.

== Population ==
Historical population
Year	Pop.	±%
1869	1,101	—
1880	954	−13.4%
1890	934	−2.1%
1900	866	−7.3%
1910	828	−4.4%
1923	807	−2.5%
1934	1,229	+52.3%
1939	1,501	+22.1%
1951	1,660	+10.6%
1961	1,750	+5.4%
1971	1,710	−2.3%
1981	1,691	−1.1%
1991	1,714	+1.4%
2001	1,651	−3.7%
2011	1,529	−7.4%

== History ==
The Romansh place names were already mentioned in 15th century documents (in 1423 "Gaschurra", in 1499 "Parthenna"), some alps even earlier (for example, in 1089 "alpem in Signes" = Zeinisalpe). Benefiting from the warmer climate in the Middle Ages, and up into the 18th century, the high alp Vermunt was used by farmers from Ardez and Guarda in the Lower Engadine (cattle drive over the Vermuntpass).

The Habsburgs ruled the places in Vorarlberg alternately from Tyrol and Vorderösterreich (Freiburg im Breisgau). From 1805 to 1814, the region belonged to Bavaria, then reverted to Austria. Gaschurn has belonged to the Austrian state of Vorarlberg since the foundation of the state in 1861.

In the middle of the 19th century, summer tourism started becoming popular. In 1885, a society for the city improvement was founded. Several Alpine Club huts were opened: In 1885 the Madlenerhaus, in 1896 the Wiesbadener Hütte, in 1908 the Tübinger Hütte, in 1910 the Saarbrücker Hütte, in 1927 the Heilbronner Hütte. Around 1910 road construction from Schruns to Partenen was begun.

=== Coat of arms ===
The coat of arms was created in 1966 following a design by the Schruns artist and heraldist Konrad Honold. It shows a water wheel and a halberd (referring to the legendary local hero and benefactor Lukas Tschofen) next to the crossed papal keys.

== Culture ==
The Tourism Museum Gaschurn was opened in 1992 – the first tourism museum in Austria.

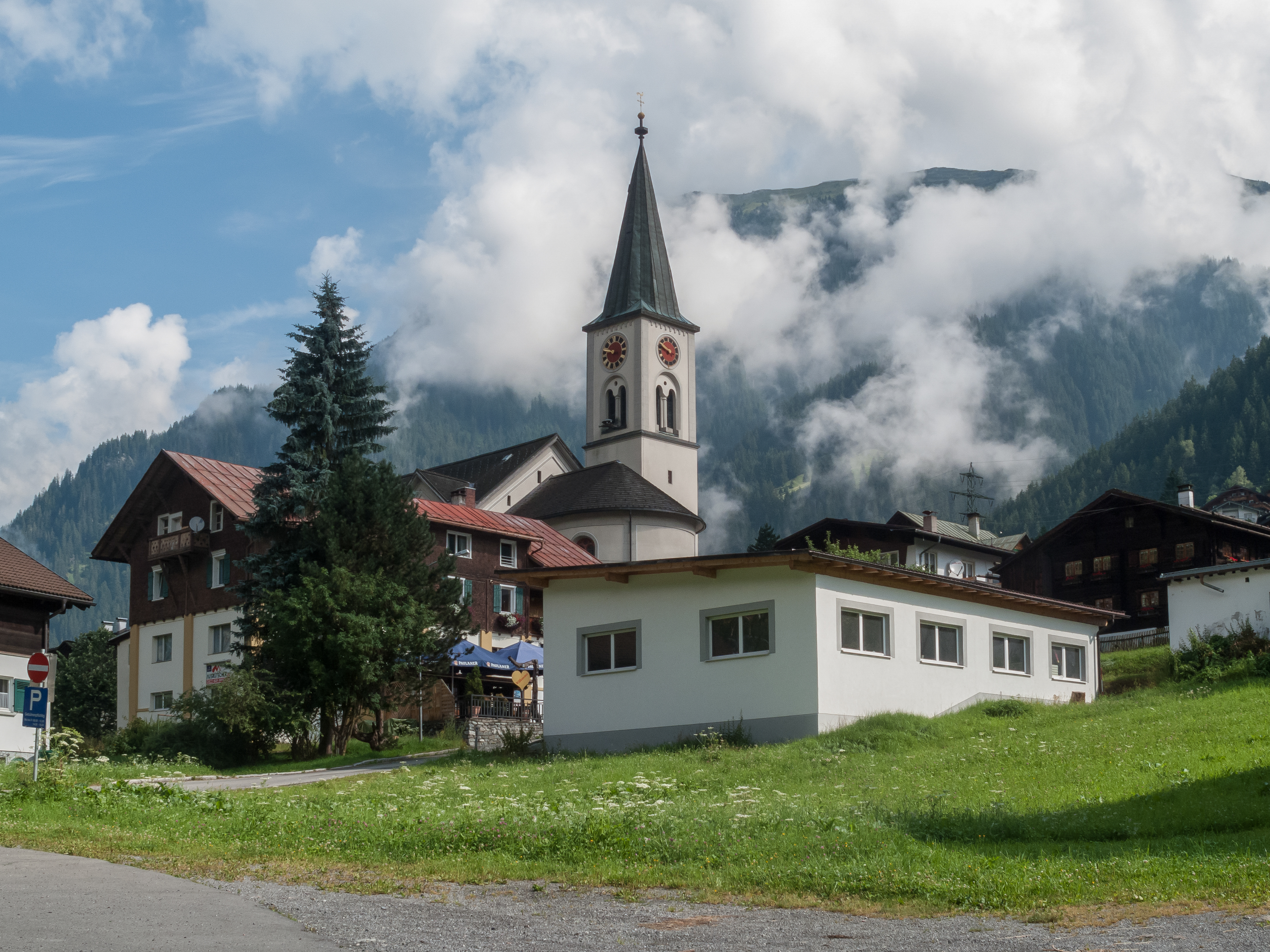
Parish Church Hl. Michael

Completed in 1986, the new community center of the village exhibits a 300-year-old traditional "Montafoner Stube" – the so-called Lukas Tschofen-Stube.

The parish church Gaschurn, a neo-Romanesque church, was inaugurated in 1869 by Bishop Franz Josef Rudigier, who was born in Partenen. The altar and ceiling paintings were created by the Schrunser brothers Franz and Jakob Bertle, in the late Nazarene style.

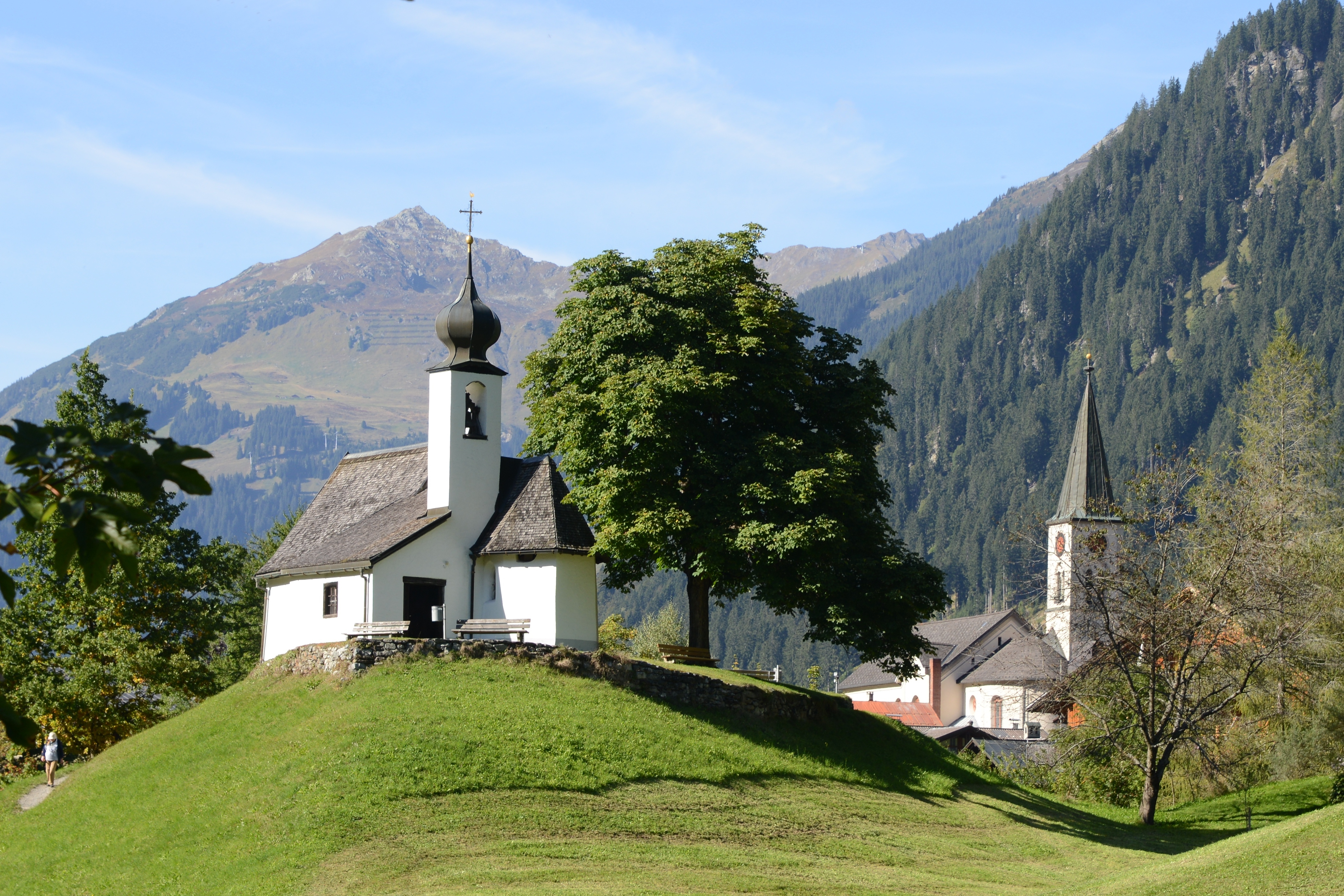
Chapel Maria Schnee

Maria Schnee Chapel. According to the inscription, the construction of the chapel dates back to 1637. The founder and builder was Lukas Tschofen. Located on a small hill in the center of the village, the chapel houses a picture of Maria Hilf (a copy of a picture of grace by Lucas Cranach the Elder) and has become a popular Marian pilgrimage site.

== Sports ==
As the largest municipality in Vorarlberg, it contains an extensive network of hiking trails (266.8 km) and numerous mountain bike trails (71.9 km). From Partenen via Gaschurn to St. Gallenkirch there is a 12 km long cycling, walking and winter hiking trail.

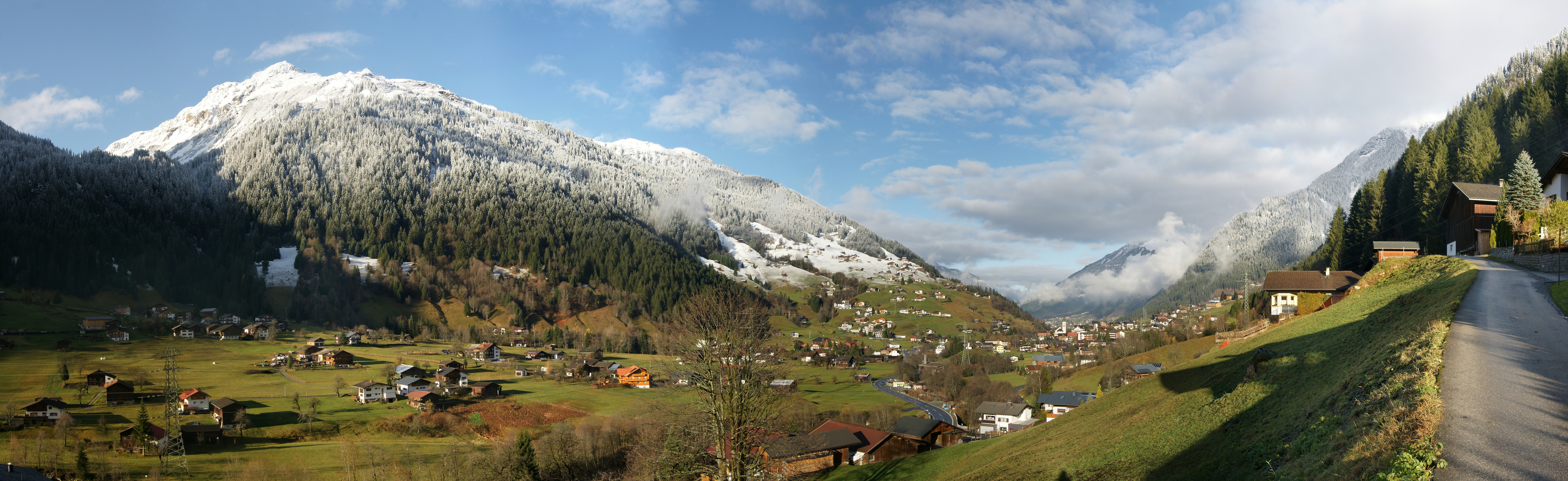
Panoramic view of Gaschurn
