= Sankt Gallenkirch =

- Municipality
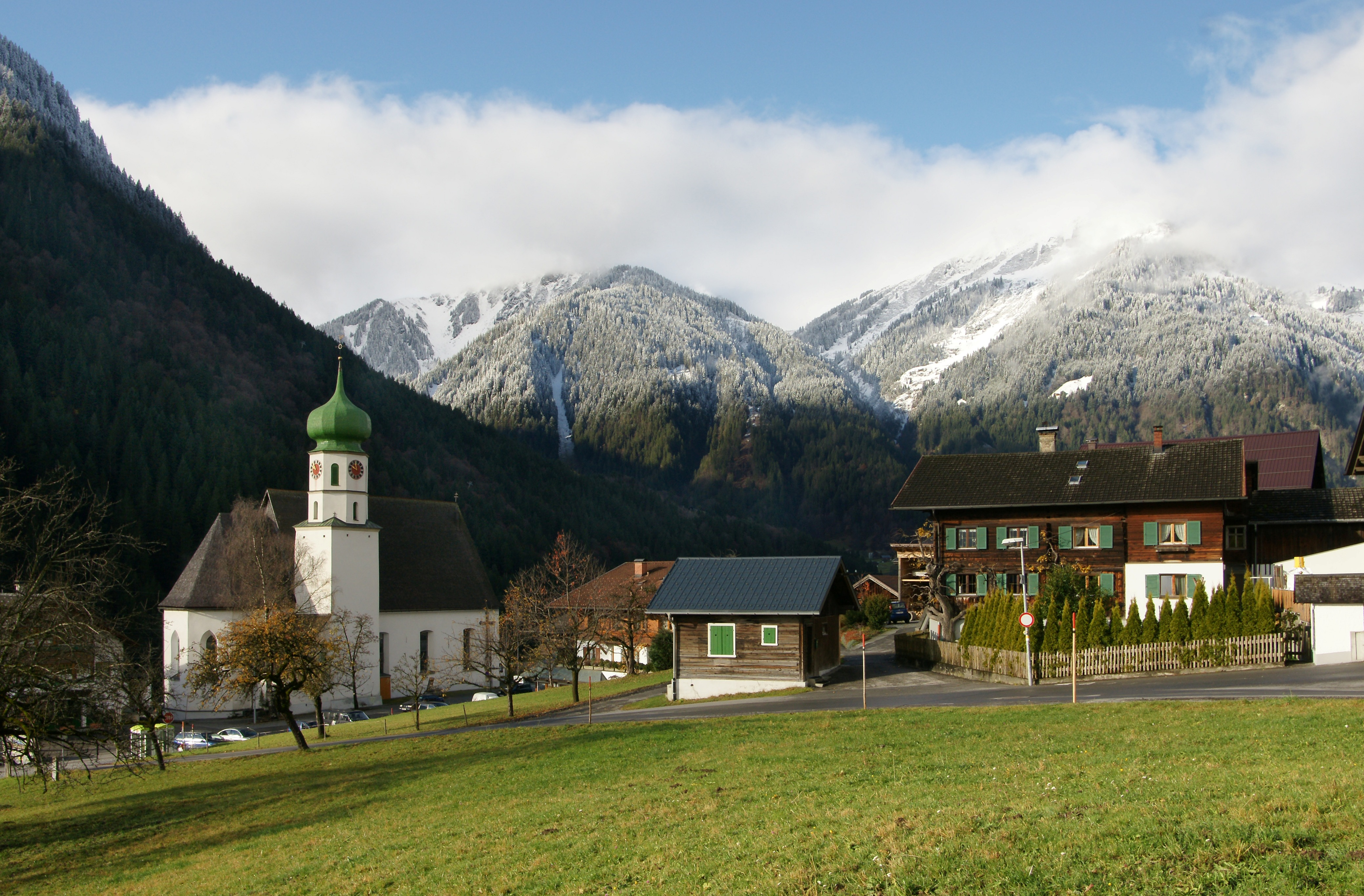

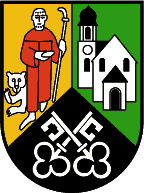
- Coat of arms

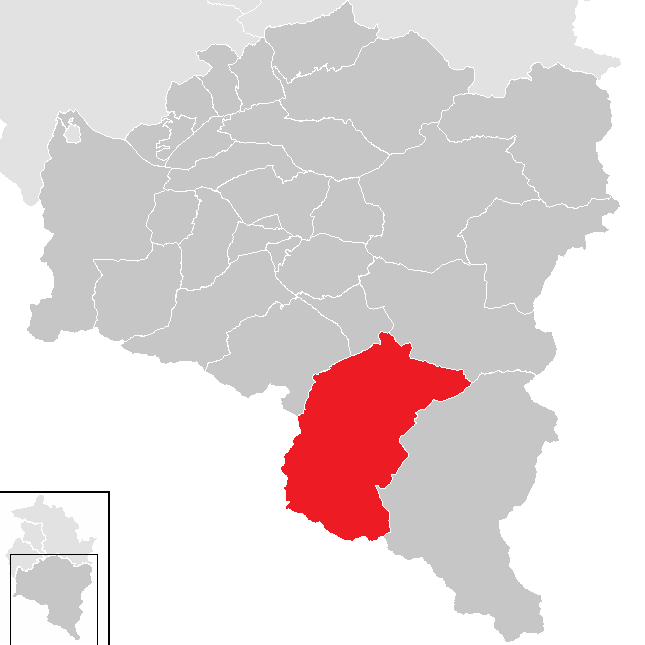
- Location in the district

- Location within Vorarlberg Location within Austria
- Coordinates: 47°01′00″N 09°58′00″E
- Country: Austria
- State: Vorarlberg
- District: Bludenz

Government
  - Mayor: Elisabeth Kuster (ÖVP)

Area
  - Total: 127.86 km^{2} (49.37 sq mi)
- Elevation: 878 m (2,881 ft)

Population (2018-01-01)
  - Total: 2,246
  - Density: 17.57/km^{2} (45.50/sq mi)
- Time zone: UTC+1 (CET)
  - Summer (DST): UTC+2 (CEST)
- Postal code: 6791
- Area code: 05557
- Vehicle registration: BZ
- Website: https://www.gemeinde.stgallenkirch.at

Sankt Gallenkirch is a municipality in the district of Bludenz in the Austrian state of Vorarlberg.

== Population ==
Historical population
Year	Pop.	±%
1869	1,316	—
1880	1,319	+0.2%
1890	1,228	−6.9%
1900	1,200	−2.3%
1910	1,270	+5.8%
1923	1,284	+1.1%
1934	1,478	+15.1%
1939	1,710	+15.7%
1951	1,745	+2.0%
1961	1,915	+9.7%
1971	1,975	+3.1%
1981	1,989	+0.7%
1991	2,121	+6.6%
2001	2,268	+6.9%
2011	2,191	−3.4%
