= Erwin Zschokke =

Swiss veterinarian (1855–1929)

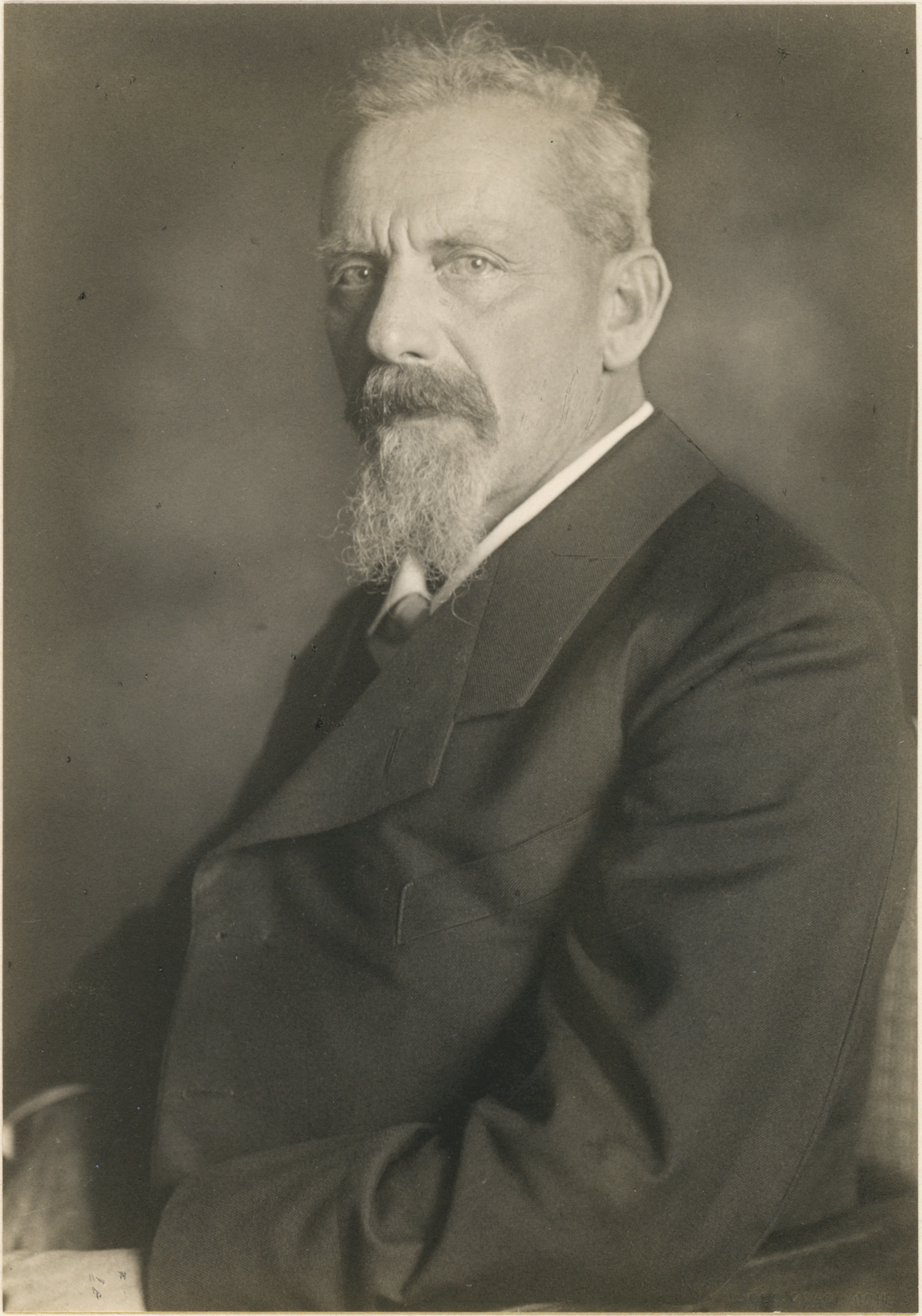
- Portrait of Erwin Zschokke, lithograph from the Album national suisse (1893)
- Born: 3 August 1855; Gontenschwil, Switzerland
- Died: 9 June 1929 (aged 73); Zürich, Switzerland
- Occupations: Veterinarian, academic
- Known for: Director of the University of Zurich veterinary faculty

Erwin Zschokke (3 August 1855 – 9 June 1929) was a Swiss veterinarian and academic. He served as director of the Zurich veterinary school and later as professor at the University of Zurich, where he was rector from 1916 to 1918.

== Family and early life ==
Zschokke was born in Gontenschwil in the canton of Aargau, the son of Achilles Zschokke, a pastor, and Susanna Gautschi. He was a Protestant citizen of Aarau and, from 1892, of Zürich. He was the brother of Richard Zschokke, a cousin of Conrad Zschokke and Friedrich Zschokke, and a nephew of Alfred Zschokke, Emil Zschokke, Peter Olivier Zschokke and Theodor Zschokke. In 1882 he married Katharina Püntener.

== Career ==
Zschokke attended the agricultural school in Muri in 1871 and studied at the veterinary medicine school in Zürich from 1873 to 1876. He opened a practice in Gontenschwil in 1876, and the following year became clinical assistant and prosector at the Zürich veterinary school. After the death of director Hans Rudolf Zangger in 1882, he took over as head of the institution, serving as its director from 1895 to 1901. The school became the faculty of veterinary medicine of the University of Zurich in 1900.

He was appointed lecturer in the agriculture section of the ETH Zurich in 1894 and professor at the University of Zurich from 1901 to 1925, serving as rector from 1916 to 1918. He directed the Zürich veterinary hospital from 1905 to 1925 and was editor-in-chief of the Schweizer Archiv für Tierheilkunde.

== Political activity and honors ==
Zschokke sat on the communal legislature of Zürich from 1889 and on the cantonal legislature from 1894. He received honorary doctorates from the universities of Zurich (1896) and Giessen (1925), as well as from the veterinary college of Budapest (1924).

== Bibliography ==
- Schweizerische landwirtschaftliche Monatshefte, 7, 1929, pp. 245–247.
- Vierteljahrsschrift der Naturforschenden Gesellschaft in Zürich, 74, 1929, p. 330 (with list of works).
- Biographisches Lexikon des Aargaus (BLAG), pp. 920–921.
