= Richard Zschokke =

Swiss civil engineer and politician (1865–1946)

Member of the National Council
- In office 1919–1935

Member of the Grand Council of Aargau
- In office 1921–1932

Personal details
- Born: 11 February 1865 Gontenschwil, Aargau, Switzerland
- Died: 25 May 1946 (aged 81) Gontenschwil, Aargau, Switzerland
- Party: Party of Farmers, Traders and Independents (BGB)
- Education: ETH Zurich
- Occupation: Civil engineer

Richard Zschokke (11 February 1865 – 25 May 1946) was a Swiss civil engineer and politician from the canton of Aargau. He directed major railway and hydroelectric projects in the Bernese Oberland and later served in the National Council and the Grand Council of Aargau.

== Early life and family ==
Zschokke was born on 11 February 1865 in Gontenschwil to Achilles Zschokke, a pastor, and Susanna Gautschi. He was a citizen of Gontenschwil, Aarau and Malans. He was the brother of Erwin Zschokke, a cousin of Conrad Zschokke and Friedrich Zschokke, and a nephew of Alfred Zschokke, Emil Zschokke, Peter Olivier Zschokke and Theodor Zschokke. In 1895 he married Ida Heinrika Zumsteg, daughter of Johann. He attended school in Gontenschwil and Menziken and the cantonal school in Aarau, before studying civil engineering at the ETH Zurich from 1883 to 1887.

== Engineering career ==
Zschokke was responsible for the expansion works of the port of Genoa and for the construction of fortifications at the Gotthard. In 1901 his engineering office was relocated to Wengen, and he became director of the construction works of the Jungfrau railway and of various electric power plants in the Bernese Oberland. He authored studies for the Pfänder railway near Bregenz, the Bernina railway and the Schöllenen railway, and directed the works for the construction of the Suvorov Monument in the Schöllenen gorge.

== Political career ==
After returning to Gontenschwil in 1914, Zschokke served as a member of the National Council for the Party of Farmers, Traders and Independents from 1919 to 1935, and as a member of the Grand Council of Aargau from 1921 to 1932. He contributed to the drafting of the federal hunting law of 1923.

== Bibliography ==
- Biographisches Lexikon des Aargaus (BLAG), pp. 919–920.
- Geschichte des Kantons Aargau (GeschAG), vol. 3, pp. 265, 309, 591.
