= Conrad Zschokke =

Swiss civil engineer and politician

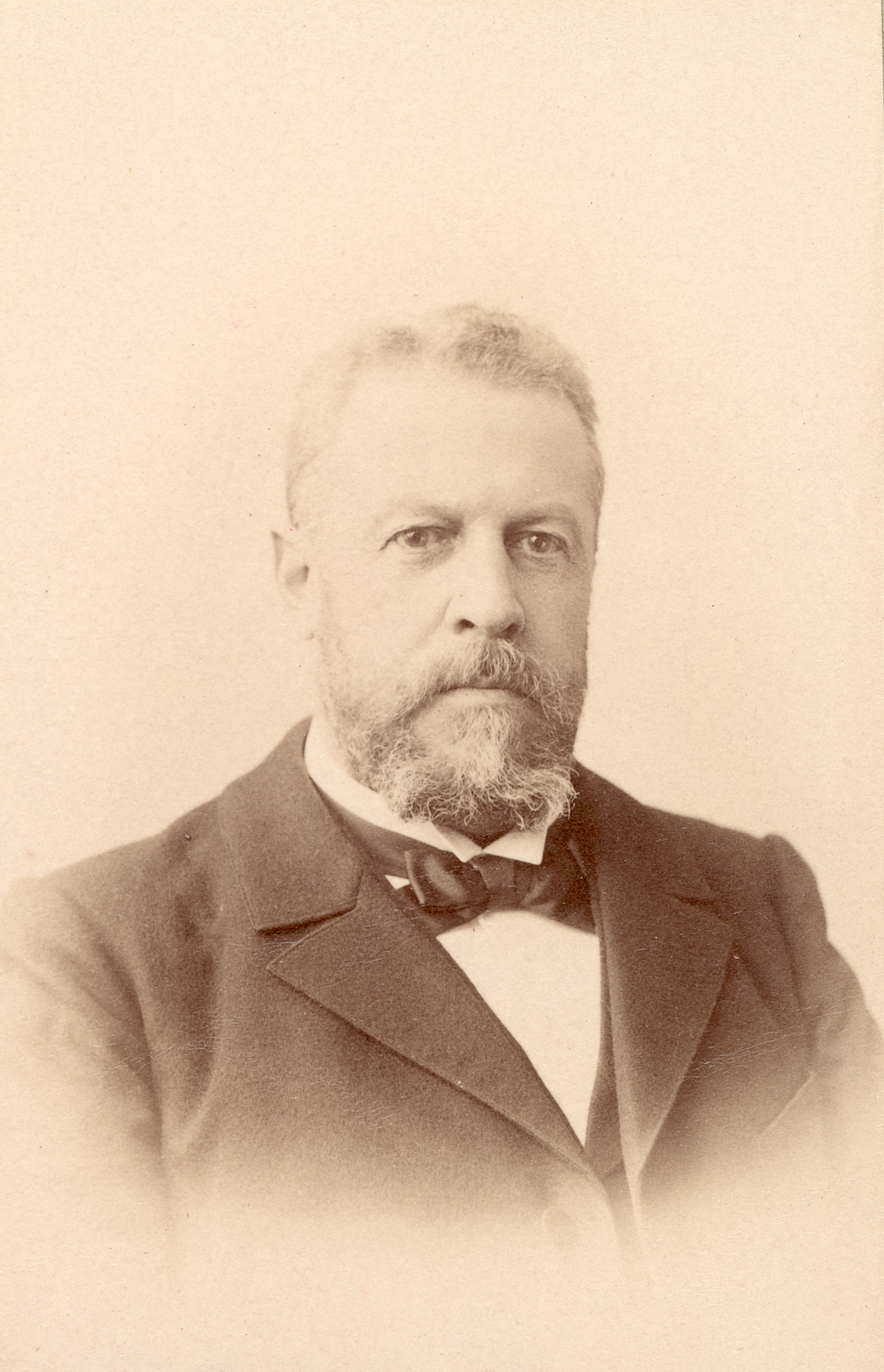
- Born: April 14, 1842; Aarau, Switzerland
- Died: December 17, 1918 (aged 76); Aarau, Switzerland
- Other name: Konradin Zschokke
- Education: ETH Zurich (1859–1862)
- Occupations: Civil engineer, politician
- Known for: Hydroelectric works, compressed-air caisson technique
- Spouse(s): 1) Eugénie Faure (m. 1867); 2) Jeanne Antoinette Disqué (m. 1909)

Conrad Zschokke (also known as Konradin Zschokke and Conradin Zschokke; 14 April 1842 – 17 December 1918) was a Swiss civil engineer and Radical politician from Aarau. He is known for major hydroelectric works across Europe and North Africa, applying the compressed-air caisson technique, and for founding the construction firm Conrad Zschokke AG. He served as a member of the Swiss National Council and as president of the Aargau Grand Council.

== Family ==
Zschokke was born on 14 April 1842 in Aarau, the son of Alexander Zschokke, a draughtsman and copper engraver, and Marie Joseph Voitel. He was a Protestant and a citizen of Malans. He was a cousin of Erwin Zschokke, Friedrich Zschokke, and Richard Zschokke, and a nephew of Alfred Zschokke, Emil Zschokke, Peter Olivier Zschokke, and Theodor Zschokke. He married Eugénie Faure in 1867 and, after her death, Jeanne Antoinette Disqué in 1909.

== Career ==
=== Engineering ===
Zschokke studied civil engineering at the ETH Zurich from 1859 to 1862. Upon graduating, he entered the Aarau branch of Locher & Cie, which was run by his uncle Peter Olivier Zschokke. From 1864 he worked as an employee, and from 1872 as a partner, of the engineers Antoine Castor and Hildevert Hersent in Paris. During this period he established numerous construction enterprises in France and Italy.

He was appointed lecturer at ETH Zurich in 1891 and professor from 1893 to 1897, serving in an honorary capacity until 1900. In 1900, he founded the Conrad Zschokke metalwork and construction workshops in Döttingen. Following his permanent return to Aarau in 1909, he established Conrad Zschokke AG, which he chaired until his death. Zschokke carried out major hydroelectric works by applying the compressed-air caisson technique, and built bridges, roads, tunnels, and metal structures across Europe and North Africa. He was also the author of numerous theoretical works on engineering.

He received an honorary doctorate from the Faculty of Sciences of the University of Zurich in 1901 and from ETH Zurich in 1915.

=== Politics ===
Zschokke served as a Radical deputy in the Grand Council of Aargau from 1892 to 1906, including as president in 1896–1897. He was a member of the Swiss National Council from 1897 to 1917 and served as its president in 1902–1903.

== Bibliography ==
=== Archival records ===
- Fonds Conrad Zschokke, ETH Library (ETH-BIB)

=== Selected works ===
- C. Courtiau et al., Zschokke, 2006 (with bibliography)
