= Vinzenz Losinger =

Swiss civil engineer and business executive

- Born: May 13, 1935; Berne, Switzerland
- Died: June 13, 2025 (aged 90); Berne, Switzerland
- Occupations: Civil engineer, business executive
- Spouse: Samra Zschokke
- Parent: Eugen Losinger (father)

Vinzenz Losinger (13 May 1935 – 13 June 2025) was a Swiss civil engineer and business executive. He served as president of the board of directors of Losinger SA, then the largest construction company in Switzerland, from 1970 to 1991.

== Life and career ==
Losinger was born on 13 May 1935 in Berne. He was the son of Eugen Losinger and the nephew of Oskar Losinger, the founders of the construction firm that bore their name. He married Samra Zschokke, daughter of Werner Zschokke, an engineer, and granddaughter of Richard Zschokke. After completing his Matura in Berne, he studied civil engineering in Lausanne and at the Swiss Federal Institute of Technology (ETH) in Zurich, graduating in 1958.

He joined Losinger SA in 1959 and rose to become president of the management board (1962), then delegate (1970–1986) and president (1970–1991) of the board of directors. At the time, Losinger SA was the largest construction company in Switzerland, active worldwide. The firm was reorganized as a general contractor in 1965, listed on the stock exchange in 1968, and by 1980 employed 5,400 staff and recorded a turnover of 650 million Swiss francs. The prestressed concrete technique known as Vorspannverfahren Losinger (VSL), along with other VSL specialties, made the company a world leader in reinforced concrete construction.

Irregularities in the American subsidiary VSL Corporation led to a crisis in 1982. Following a 50% stake acquisition by the Dallas-based Enserch Corporation in 1983, the majority of shares were sold to the French group Bouygues in 1990. Losinger left the company in 1991 and subsequently worked as a consultant.

Beyond his role at Losinger SA, he was a co-founder of the Swiss construction industry group and the Swiss builders' conference. He was a member of the Swiss Chamber of Commerce, president of the Bernese Chamber of Commerce and Industry (USCI), and a member of the economic commission of the Swiss Radical Democratic Party. In the army, he reached the rank of colonel in the Corps of Engineers.

== Bibliography ==
=== Works ===
- Erfolg und Krise einer Unternehmung, 1992
