= List of mayors of Aarau =

Coat of arms of Aarau

This is a list of mayors of the city of Aarau, Switzerland. The Stadtammann chairs the Stadtrat, the executive of Aarau. Since 1 January 2014, the function is called Stadtpräsident.

List of mayors:

Mayor (Stadtammann) of Aarau
Term	Mayor	Lifespan	Party	Notes
1803–1808	David Frey	(1751–1827)		
1809–1818	Friedrich Frey	(1748–1818)		
1818–1827	Heinrich Reift	(1749–1833)		
1828–1831	Johann Georg Hunziker	(1774–1850)		
1832–1843	Daniel Frey	(1778–1856)		
1844–1851	Friedrich Schmuziger	(1802–1866)		
1852–1854	David Zimmerli	(1792–1875)		first term
1854–1855	Theodor Schmidlin	(1810–1894)		first term
1855–1856	David Zimmerli	(1792–1875)		second term
1857–1865	Rudolf Weiersmüller	(1813–1875)		
1866–1875	Theodor Schmidlin	(1810–1894)		second term
1875–1889	Erwin Tanner	(1838–1903)		
1890–1906	Max Schmidt	(1862–1951)	FDP	
1907–1932	Hans Hässig	(1860–1936)	FDP	
1932–1938	Hermann Rauber	(1888–1938)	FDP	
1938–1947	Fridolin Laager	(1883–1975)	BGB	
1947–1961	Erich Zimmerlin	(1909–1999)	FDP	
1962–1973	Willy Urech	(1912–1986)	FDP	
1974–1987	Markus Meyer	(1934–2015)	FDP	
1987–2013	Marcel Guignard	(born 1949)	FDP	
2014–2017	Jolanda Urech	(born 1953)	SPS	
2018–	Hanspeter Hilfiker	(born 1965)	FDP	
