= Pfänderbahn =

Cable car in Bregenz, Austria

Coordinates: 47.5048°N 9.7529°E

- Pfänderbahn
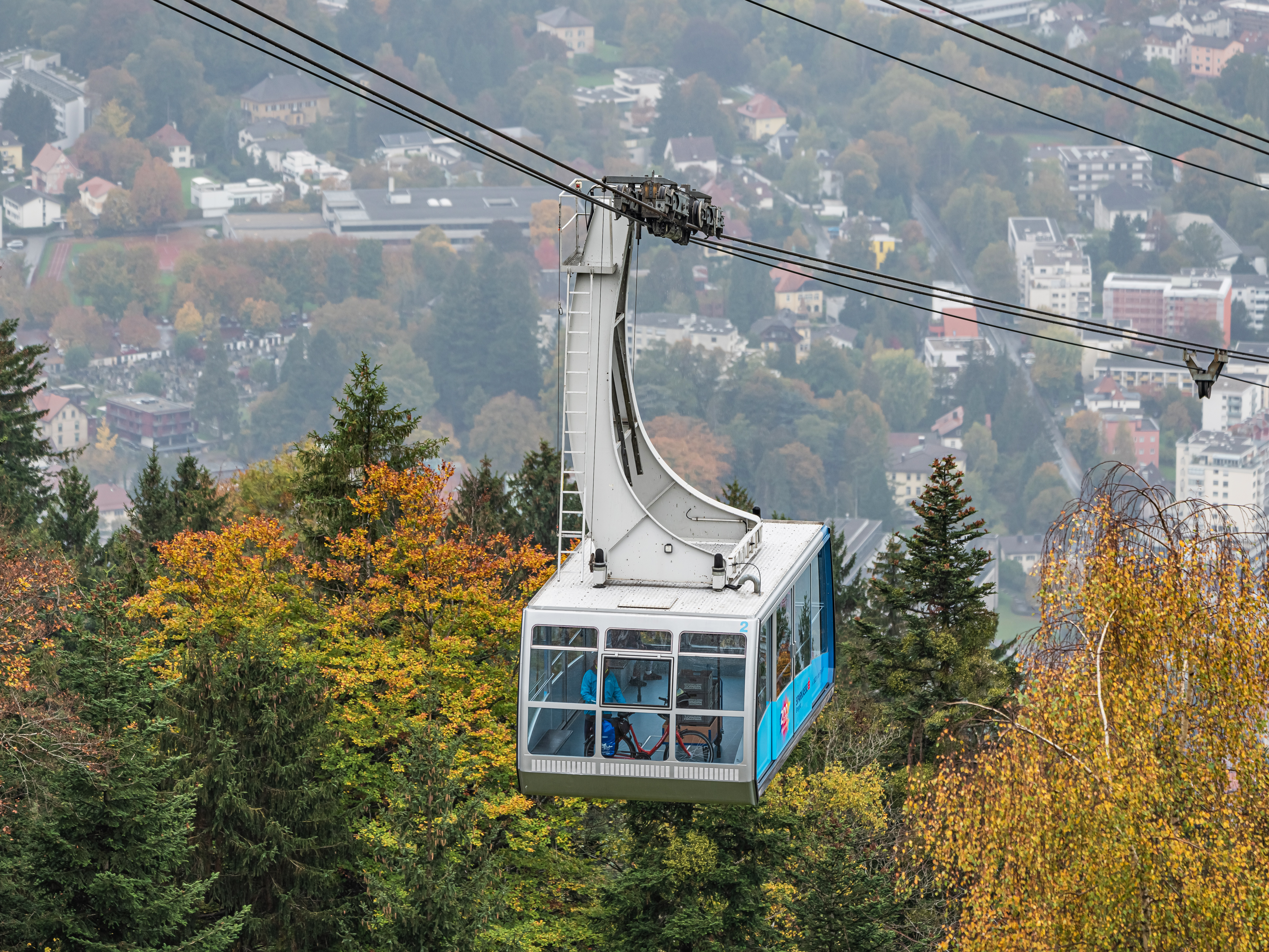
- Interactive map of Pfänderbahn

Overview
- Status: Operational
- Character: Elevated
- Location: Bregenz and Lochau, Vorarlberg
- Country: Austria
- Termini: Bregenz; Pfänder
- Elevation: lowest: 419 m (1,375 ft) highest: 1,022 m (3,353 ft)
- No. of stations: 2
- Open: 1927
- Reopened: 1994

Operation
- Carrier capacity: 80
- Trips daily: max. 6 per hour
- Trip duration: 6 minutes

Technical features
- Aerial lift type: aerial tramway
- Line length: 2,063 m (6,768 ft)
- No. of support towers: 2
- No. of cables: 2
- Operating speed: 12 m/s (39 ft/s)

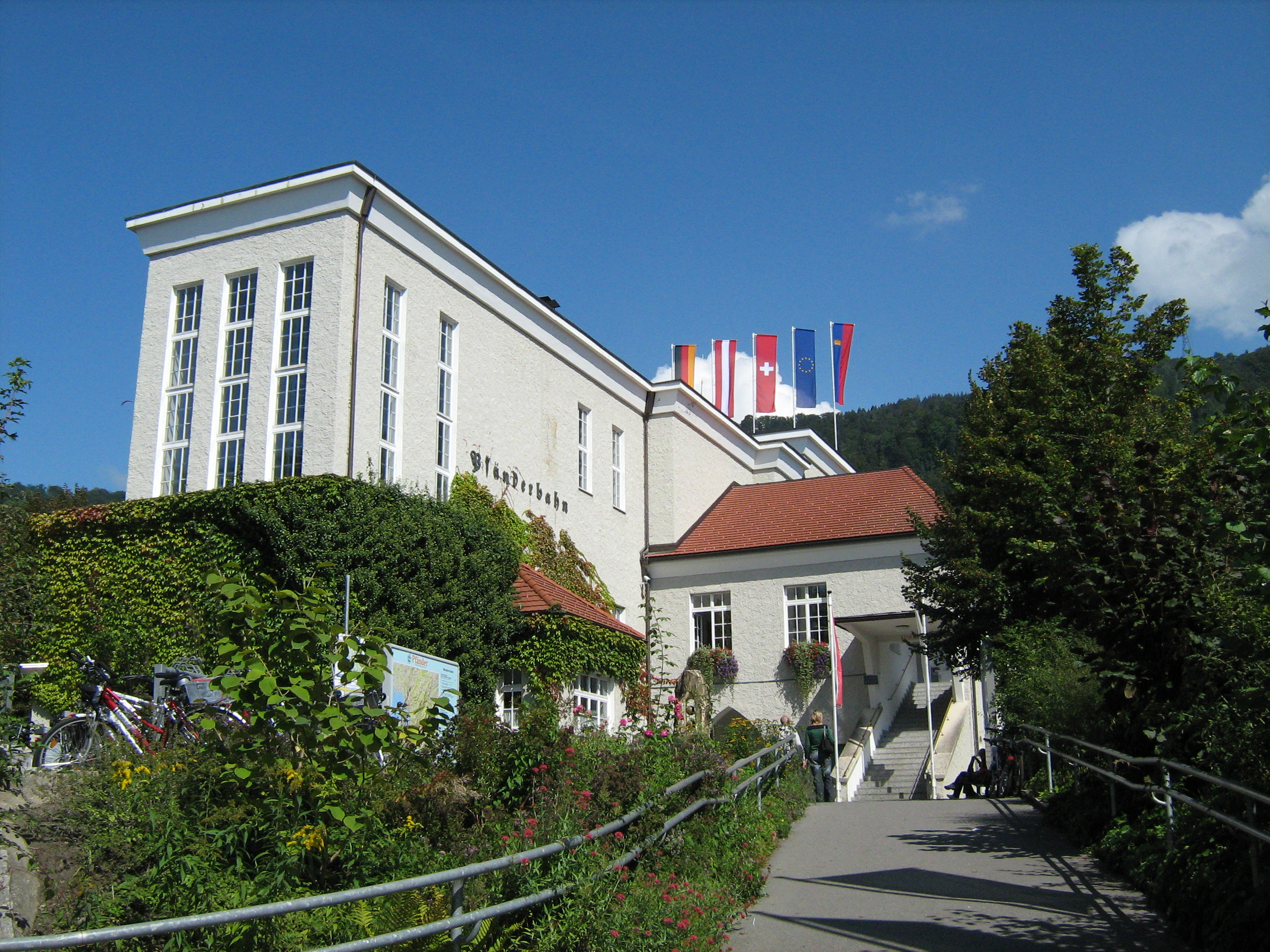
Valley station

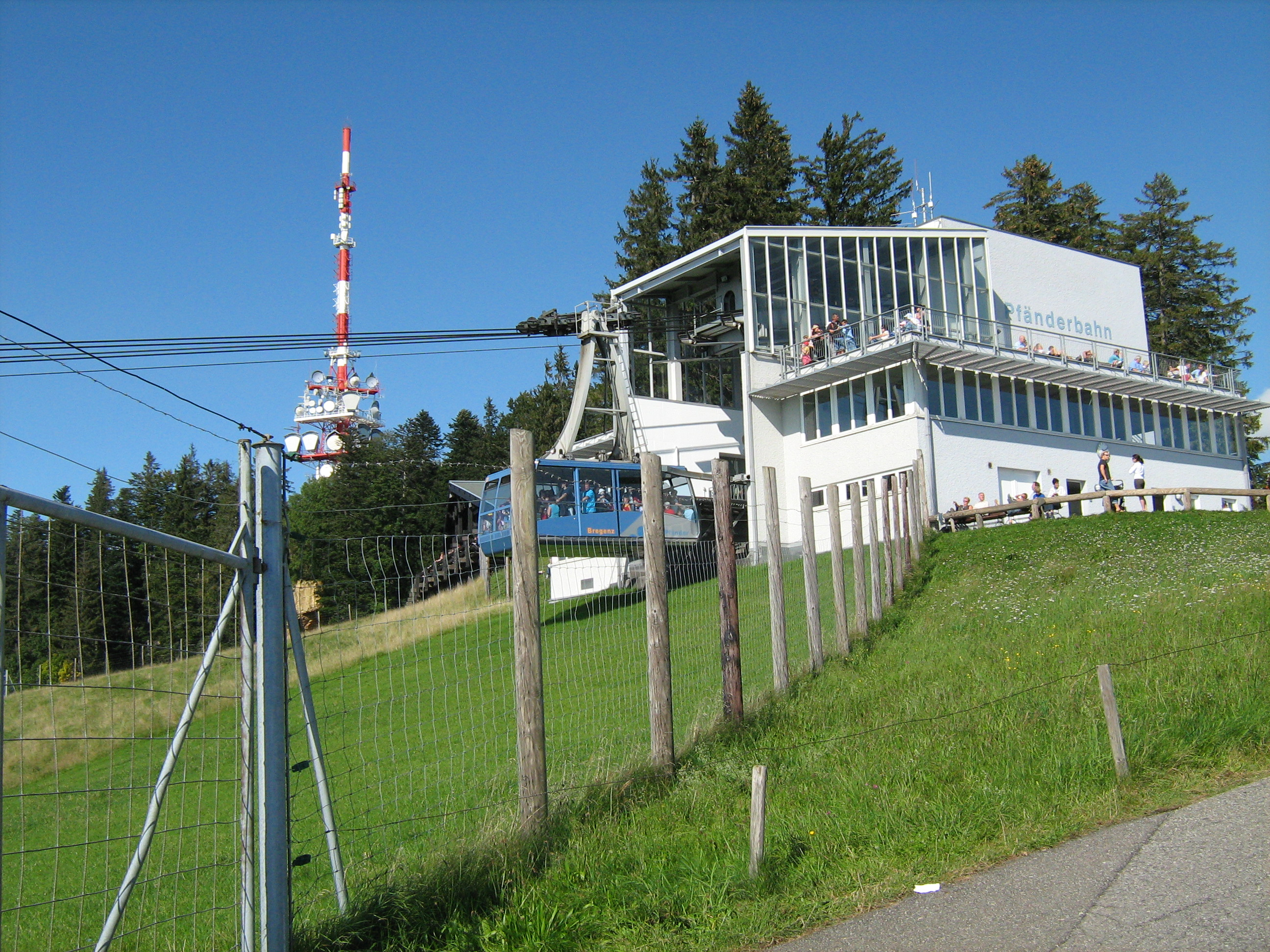
Mountain station

The Pfänderbahn (lit. 'Mount Pfänder cable car') is an aerial tramway in Bregenz in the westernmost Austrian state of Vorarlberg. It connects the shore of Lake Constance (Bodensee) at 419 m (1,375 ft) above sea level with the 1,022 m (3,353 ft) high mountain station near the Pfänderspitze.

The valley station in Bregenz is located ca. 600 m (0.37 mi) from Bregenz Hafen and 1.2 km (0.75 mi) from Bregenz railway stations.

== History ==
=== Planning ===
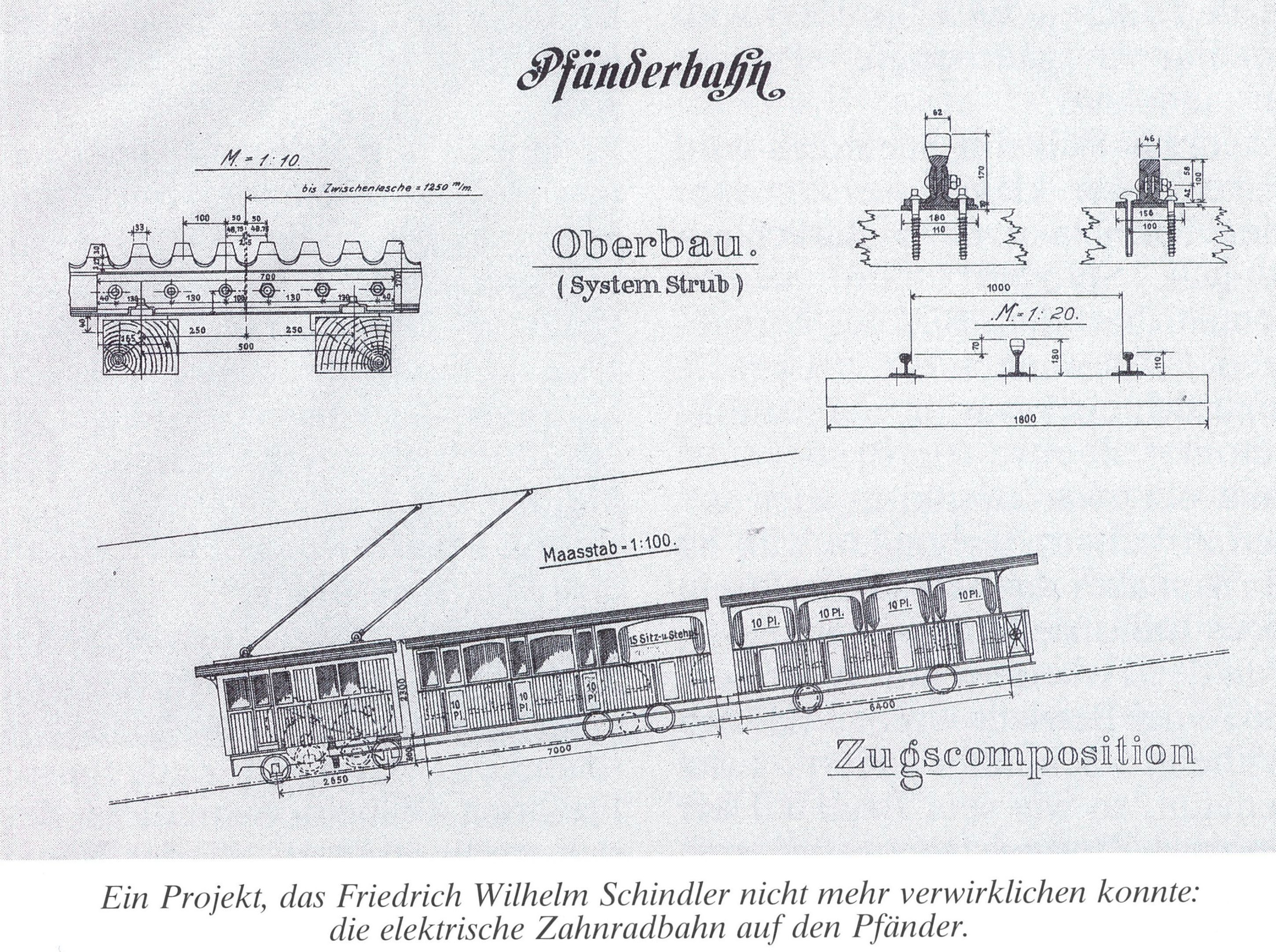
Design of the cog railway

Originally, the establishment of a cog railway was considered, but it was eventually decided for cost and ease of use in times of heavy snow.

=== Construction and opening ===
The Pfänderbahn was built from July 1926 to February 1927 and opened on 20 March 1927 by President Michael Hainisch. Construction work was undertaken by Adolf Bleichert & Co. of Leipzig. Plans for the station buildings were by Bregenz architect Willibald Braun.

=== 1994 overhaul ===
In October 1994, the cable car system was extensively overhauled:

- Replacement of gondolas, they are now fully glazed and can accommodate up to 80 people.
- Removal of two supports, providing a higher rope guide.
- Installation of a hydraulic device for cable tension.
- The stations are sliding platforms used to optimally utilize the available space.
- A hydraulic system stabilized the gondola in the parking position so that getting in and out is very easy and accessible for wheelchair users.

The renovations were undertaken by Doppelmayr. In 1998, the Pfänderbahn museum opened.

== Specifications ==
The height difference of 603 m (1,978 ft) is covered in a total distance of 2,063 m (6,768 ft) using a dual aerial tramway. The sloping portions comprises about 1,980 m (6,500 ft); the horizontal portion about 80 m (260 ft). At an average slope of 31%, the cabins move with a speed of up to twelve feet per second. The journey takes six minutes, with a turnaround of 10 minutes. The gondolas are powered by two 500 kW DC electric motors. Power supply to the cable car is via two separate power supplies. In addition, an emergency generator and batteries are available. Communication between valley and mountain stations is analogous via the cable itself.

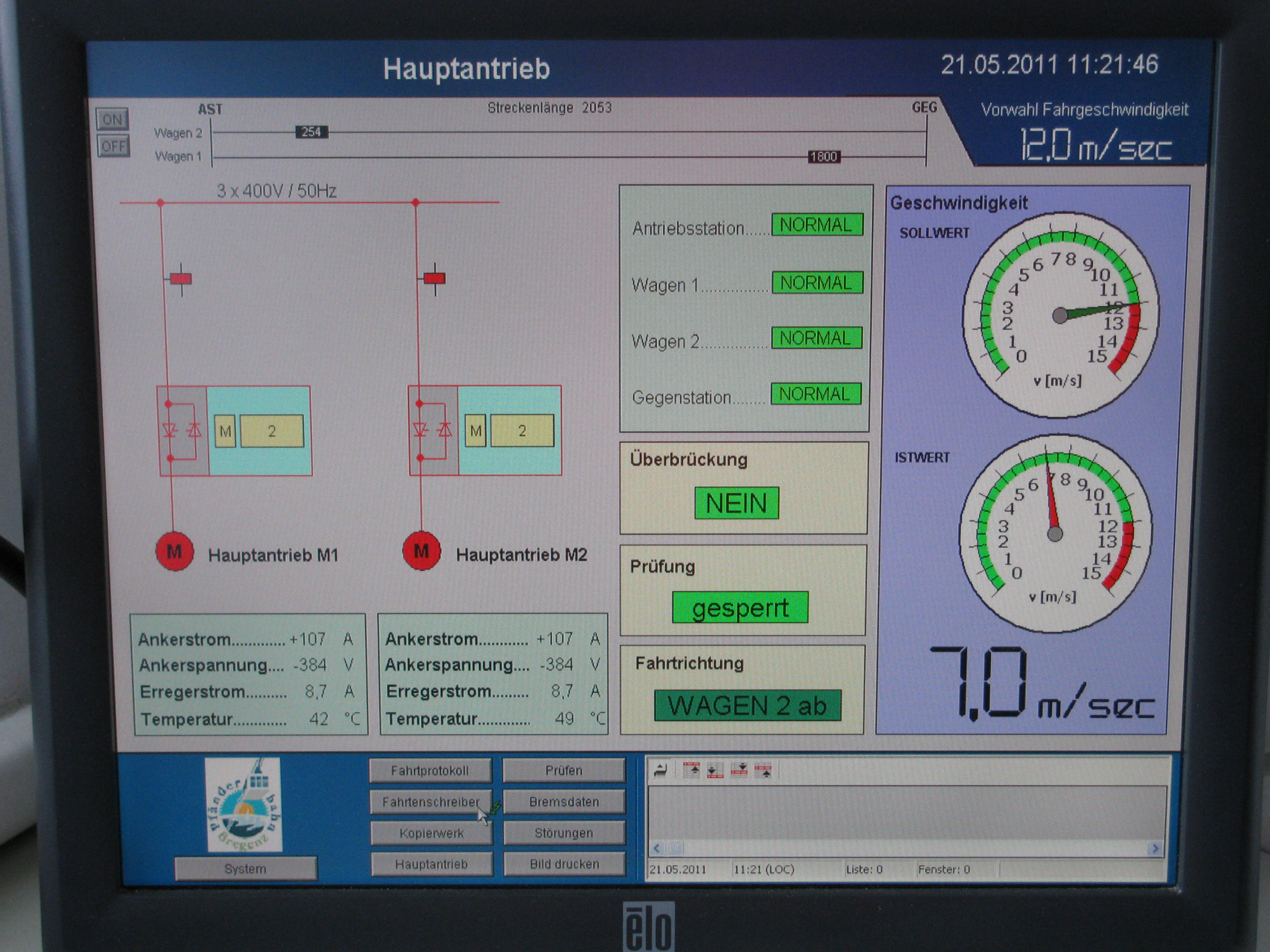
Monitor path control

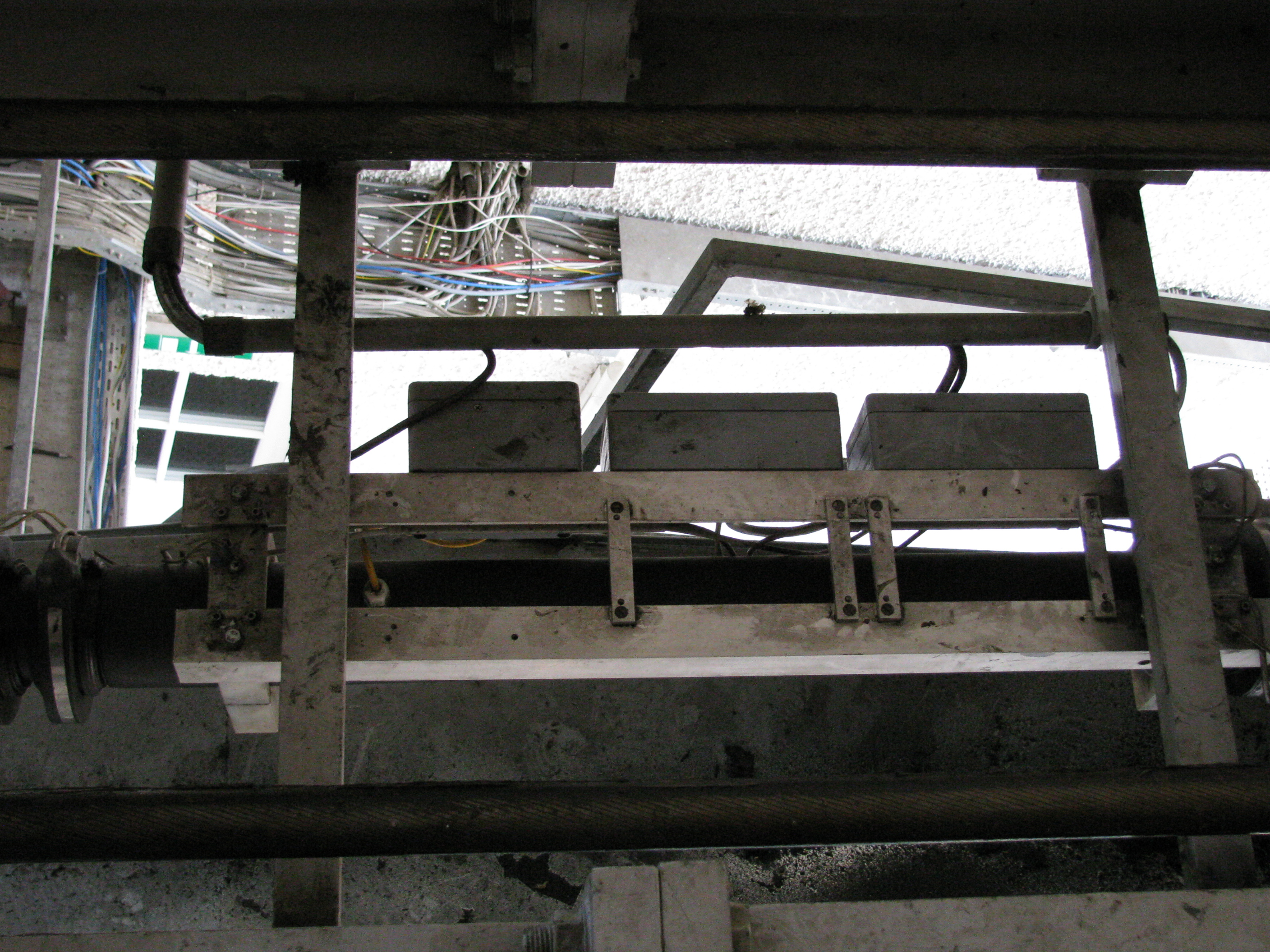
Coupling of the analog signals in the supporting cable

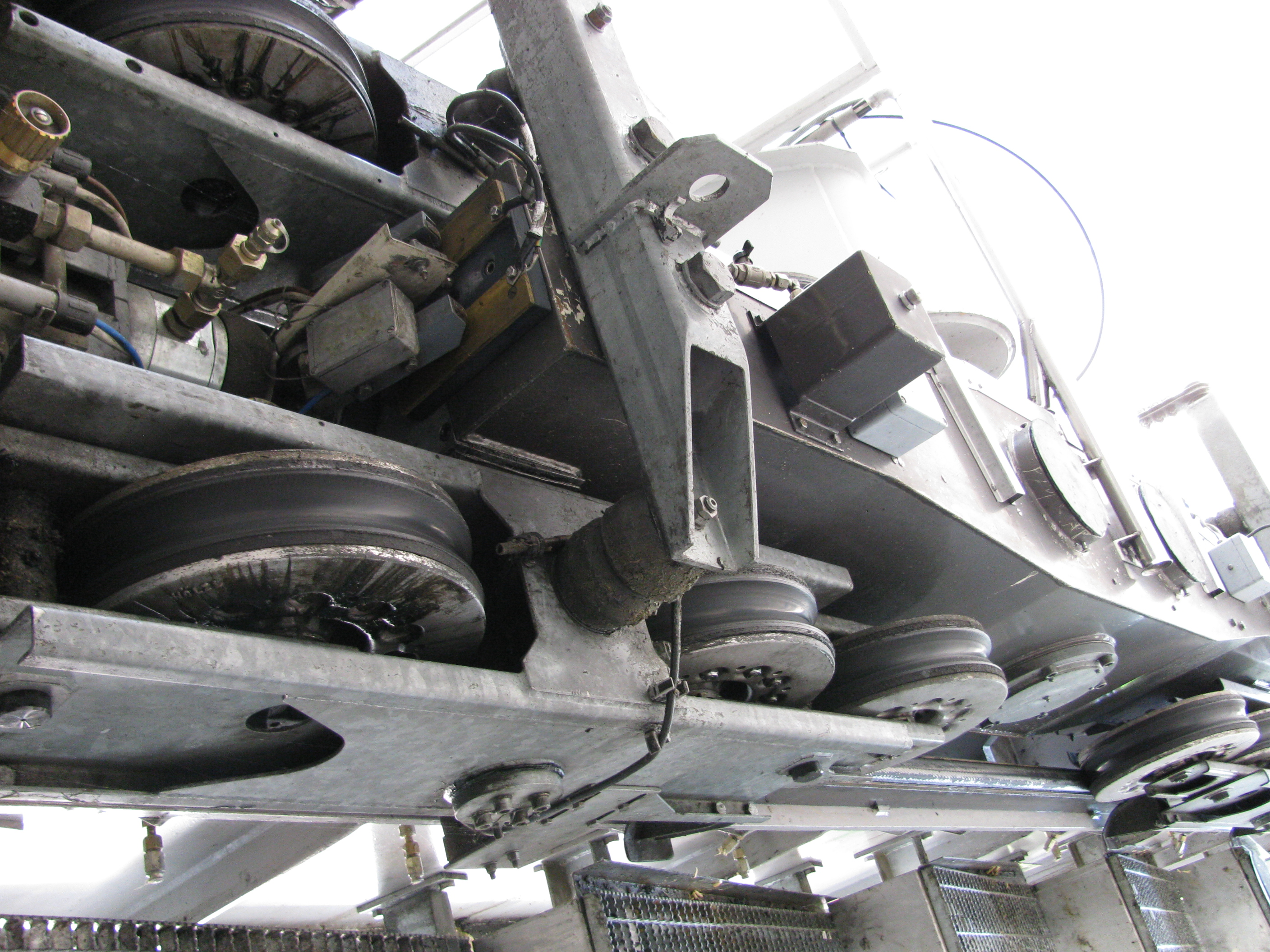
Wheels

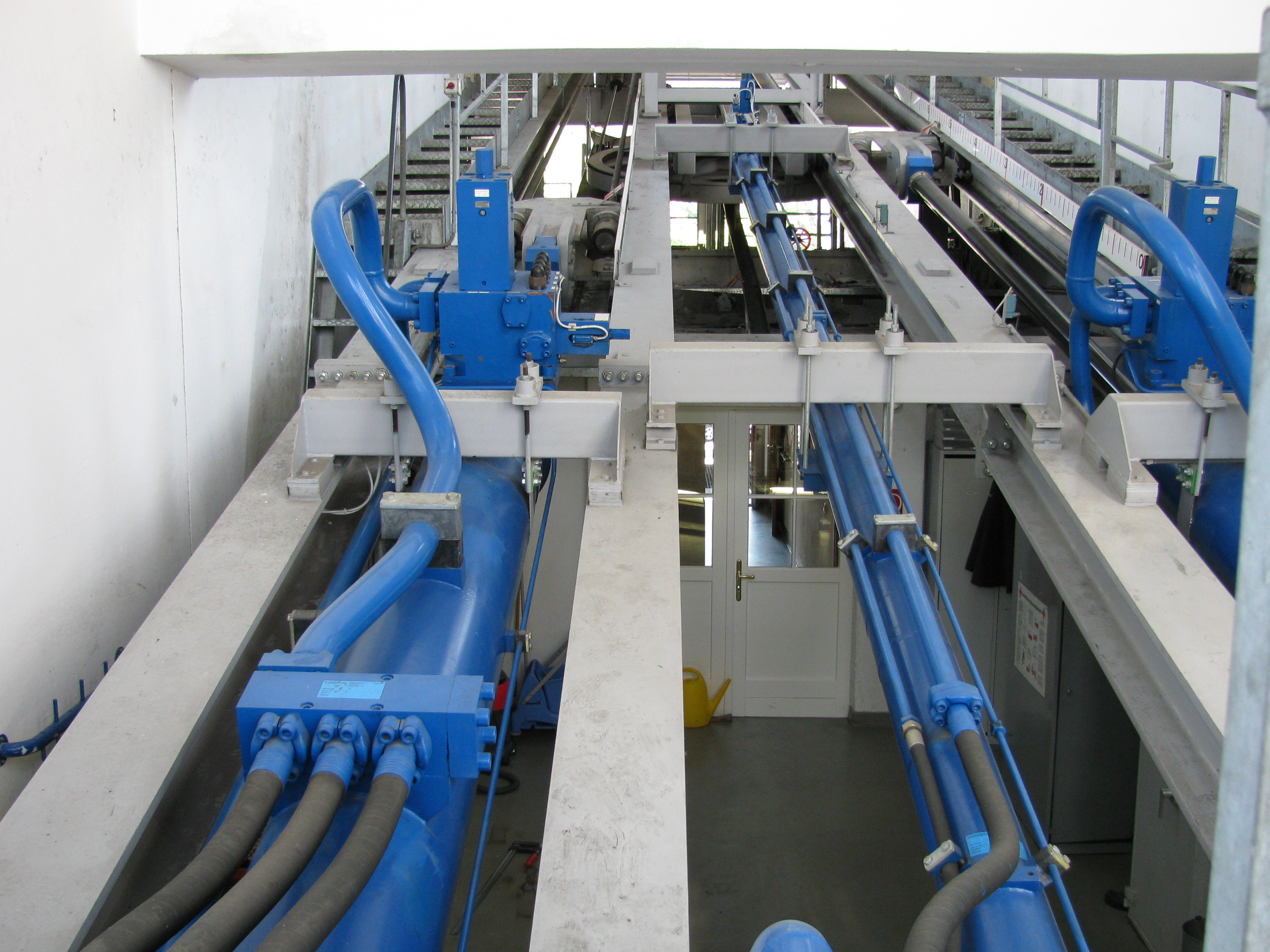
Hydraulic cylinder for cable tension

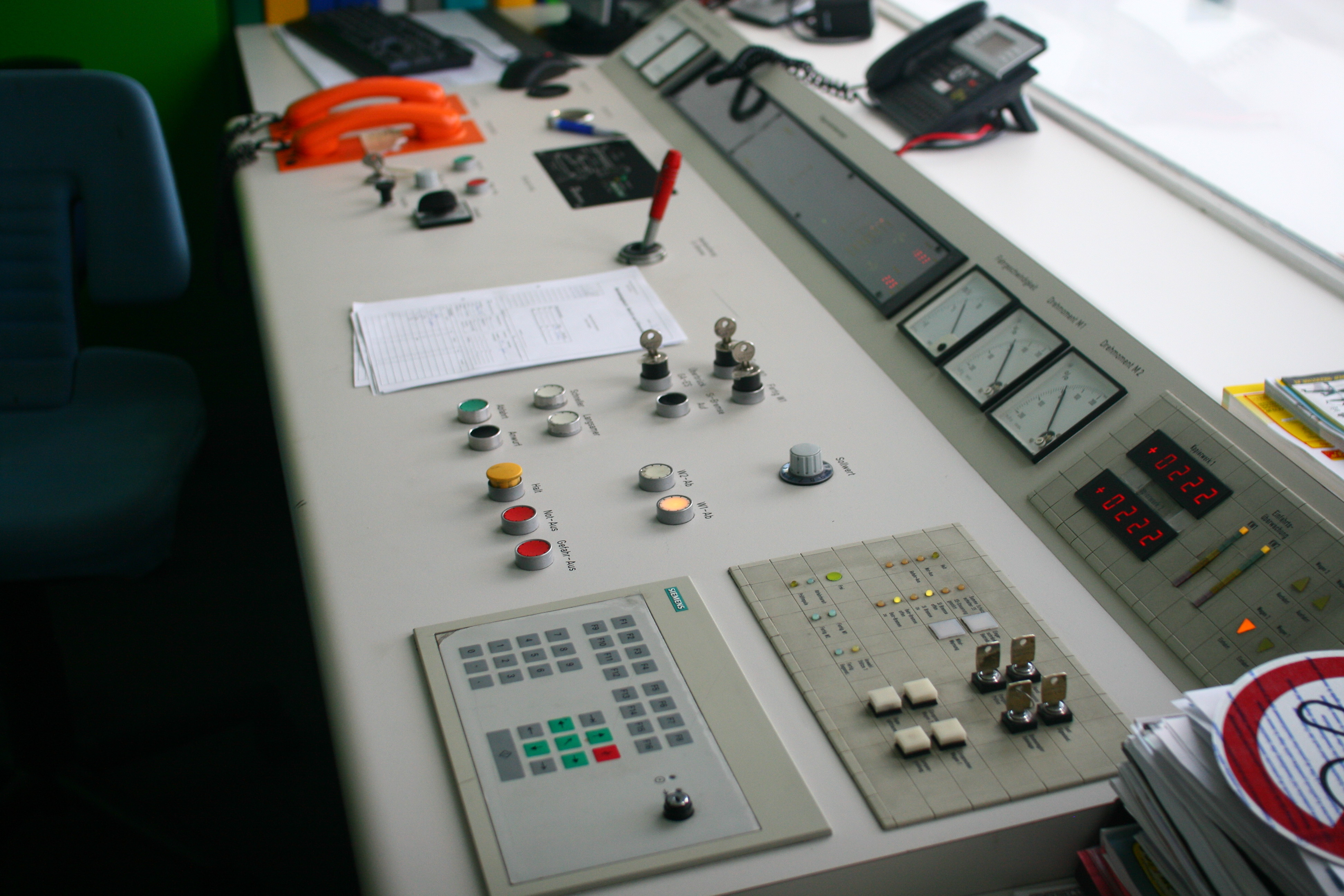
Control panel in the cab

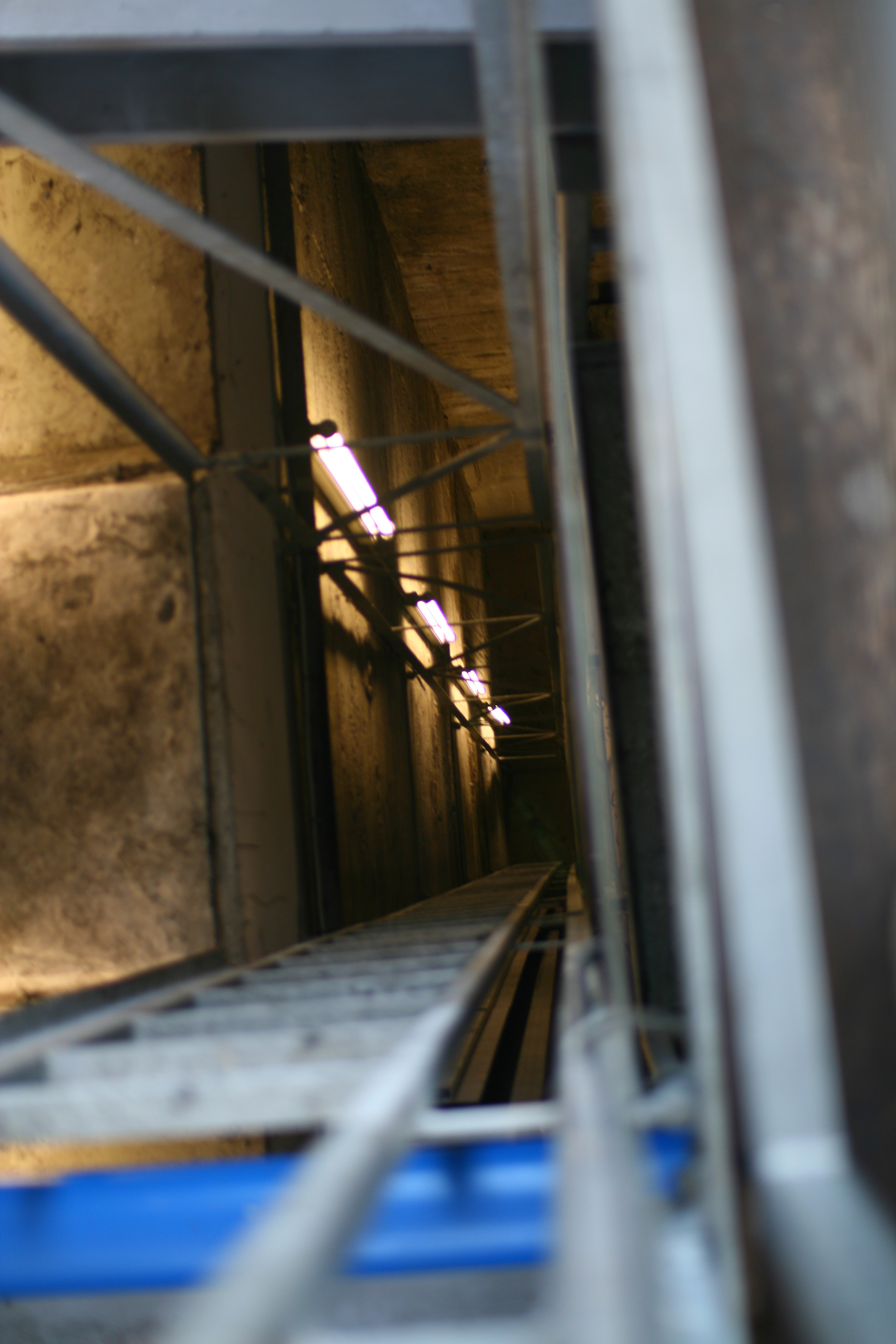
Weight for the counterweight shaft

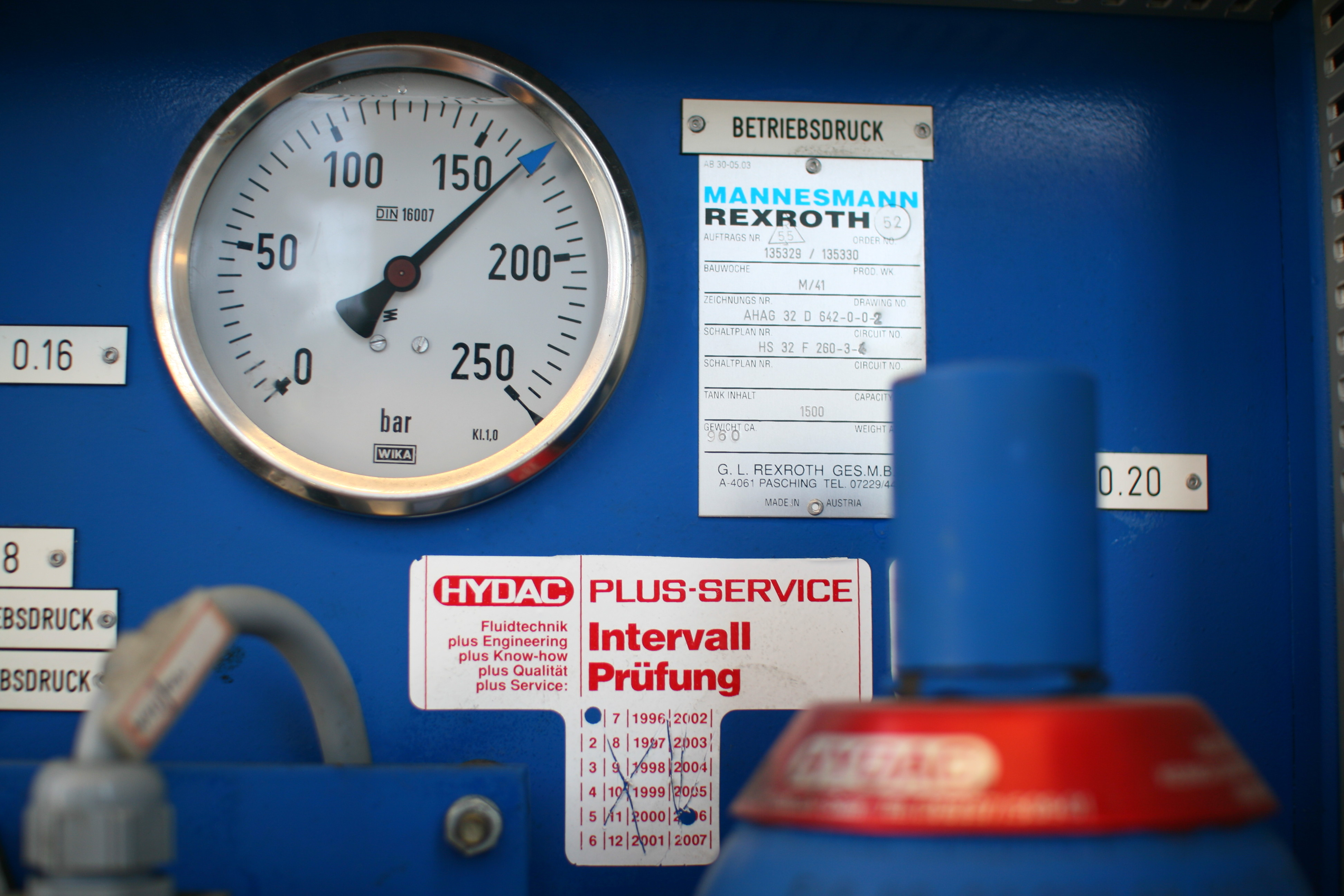
Hydraulic control

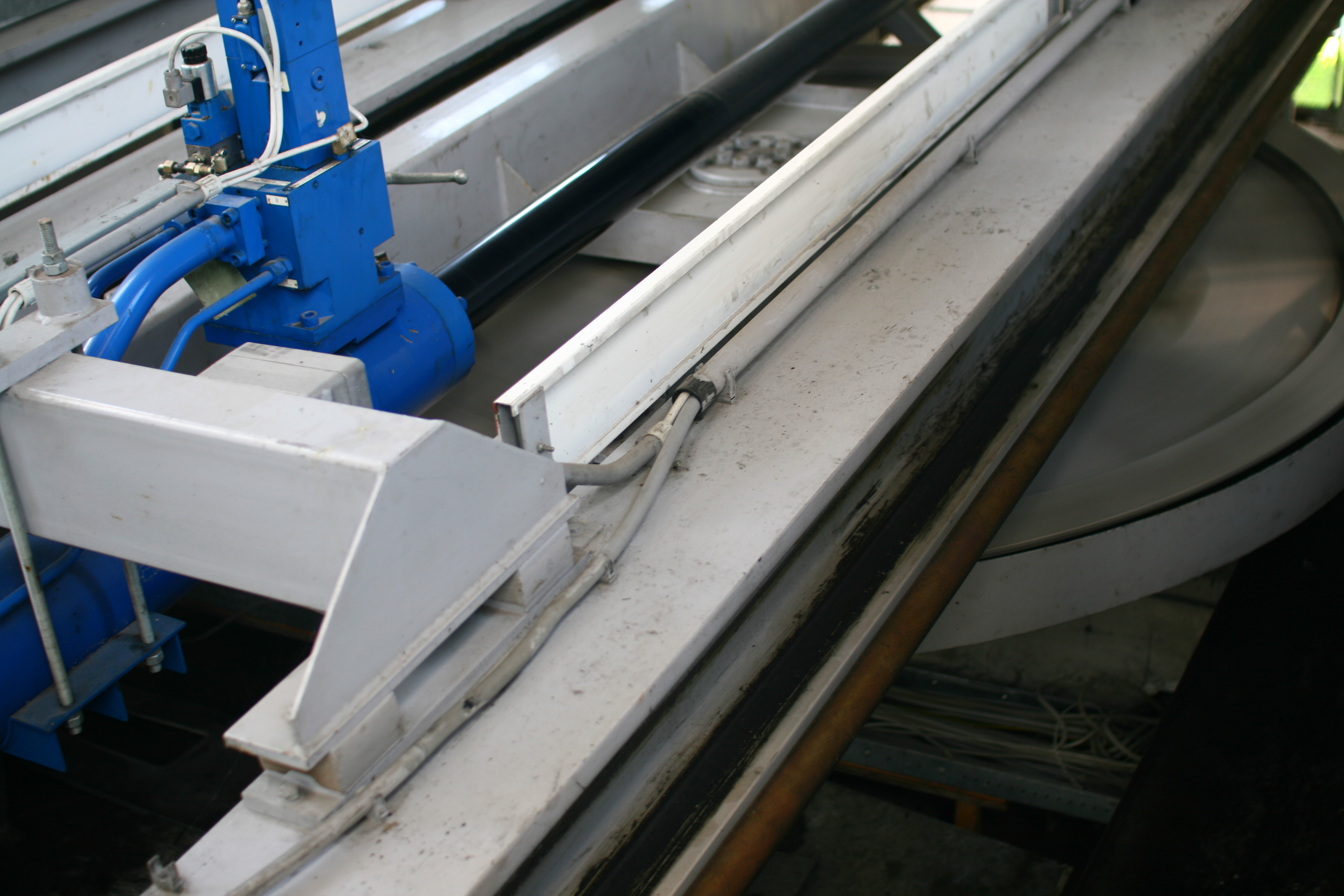
Zugumseilumlenkrolle

== See also ==
- List of aerial tramways in Austria
- Transport in Austria
