= Table Mountain Aerial Cableway =

Cable car to the top of Table Mountain in Cape Town, South Africa

Coordinates: 33°57′11.89″S 18°24′11.7″E

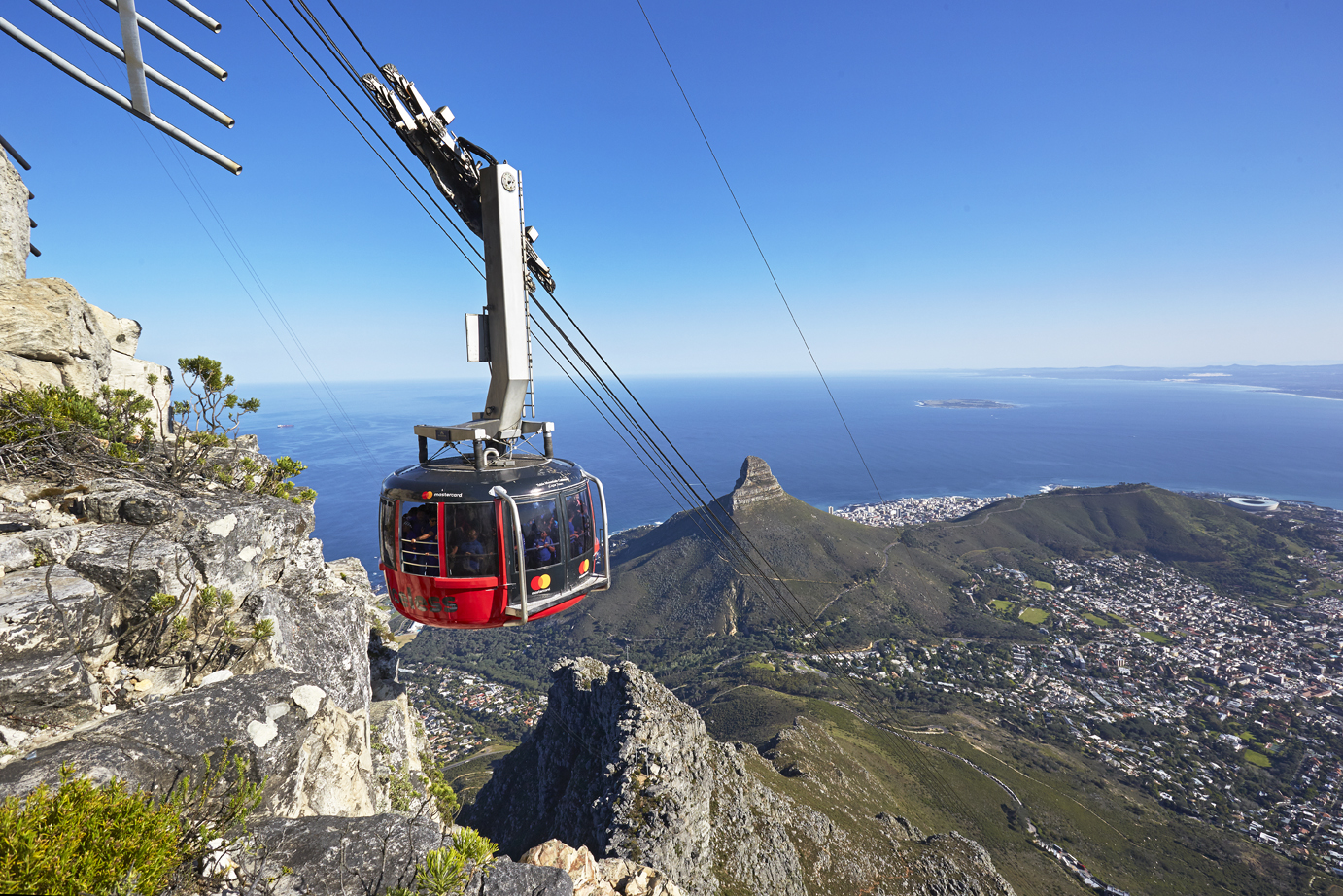
- Interactive map of Table Mountain Aerial Cableway

Overview
- Location: Cape Town
- Country: South Africa
- Open: 4 October 1929
- Website: www.tablemountain.net

Operation
- Operator: Table Mountain Aerial Cableway Company
- No. of carriers: 2
- Carrier capacity: 65
- Trip duration: 4 to 5 minutes

Technical features
- Aerial lift type: Aerial tramway
- Manufactured by: Adolf Bleichert & Co.
- Vertical Interval: 765 metres (2,510 ft)

The Table Mountain Aerial Cableway is a cable car transportation system offering visitors a five-minute ride to the top of Table Mountain in Cape Town, South Africa. It is one of Cape Town's most popular tourist attractions with approximately one million people a year using the Cableway.

The upper cable station is on the westernmost end of the Table Mountain plateau, at an elevation of 1,067 metres (3,501 ft). The upper cable station offers views over Cape Town, Table Bay and Robben Island to the north, and the Atlantic seaboard to the west and south. Amenities at the upper station include free guided walking tours, an audio tour, meal options at a café and a wi-fi lounge.

== History ==
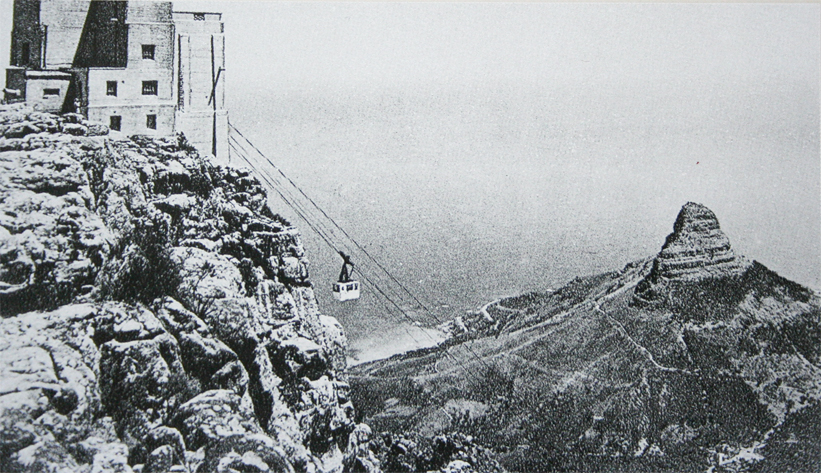
The old Cableway on Table Mountain in 1929

By the 1870s, Capetonians had proposed a railway to the top of Table Mountain, but plans were halted by the Anglo-Boer War. The City Council began investigating the options again in 1912, but this was in turn halted by the First World War.

Despite initial cost estimates of £100,000 (equivalent to £38,800,000 in 2011 pounds) to build the cableway the city's population was supportive of the project and in a referendum overwhelmingly voted in support of the project.

A Norwegian engineer, Trygve Strømsøe, presented plans for the cableway to Sir Alfred Theodore Hennessy along with Sir David Graaff and Sir Ernest Oppenheimer in 1926, and construction began soon after with the formation of the Table Mountain Aerial Cableway Company (TMACC).

Former world leading wire ropeway company Adolf Bleichert & Co. from Leipzig (Germany) was awarded the contract for the construction. It was completed in 1929 at a cost of £60,000 (equivalent to £11,400,000 in 2011 pounds) and the cableway was opened on 4 October 1929, by the Mayor of Cape Town AJS Lewis. The cableway has been upgraded three times since then.

Sir David Graaff, a leading industrialist, former mayor of Cape Town and government minister, also invested heavily in the project. TMACC’s opportunity on Table Mountain all started when Hennessy and his fellow businessmen, Sir David Graaff and Sir Ernest Oppenheimer, formed the TMACC after Norwegian engineer Trygve Strømsøe spotted the mountain and suggested a cable car to get to the top, presenting them with his idea in 1926. Strømsøe was offered a fourth seat on the board of directors when TMACC was formed, seeing the opening of the cable car.

In 1993, the son of one of the founders sold the TMACC and the new owners took charge of upgrading the cableway. In 1997, the cableway was reopened after extensive renovations, and new cars were introduced.

In January 2019, the Cableway welcomed its 28 millionth visitor.

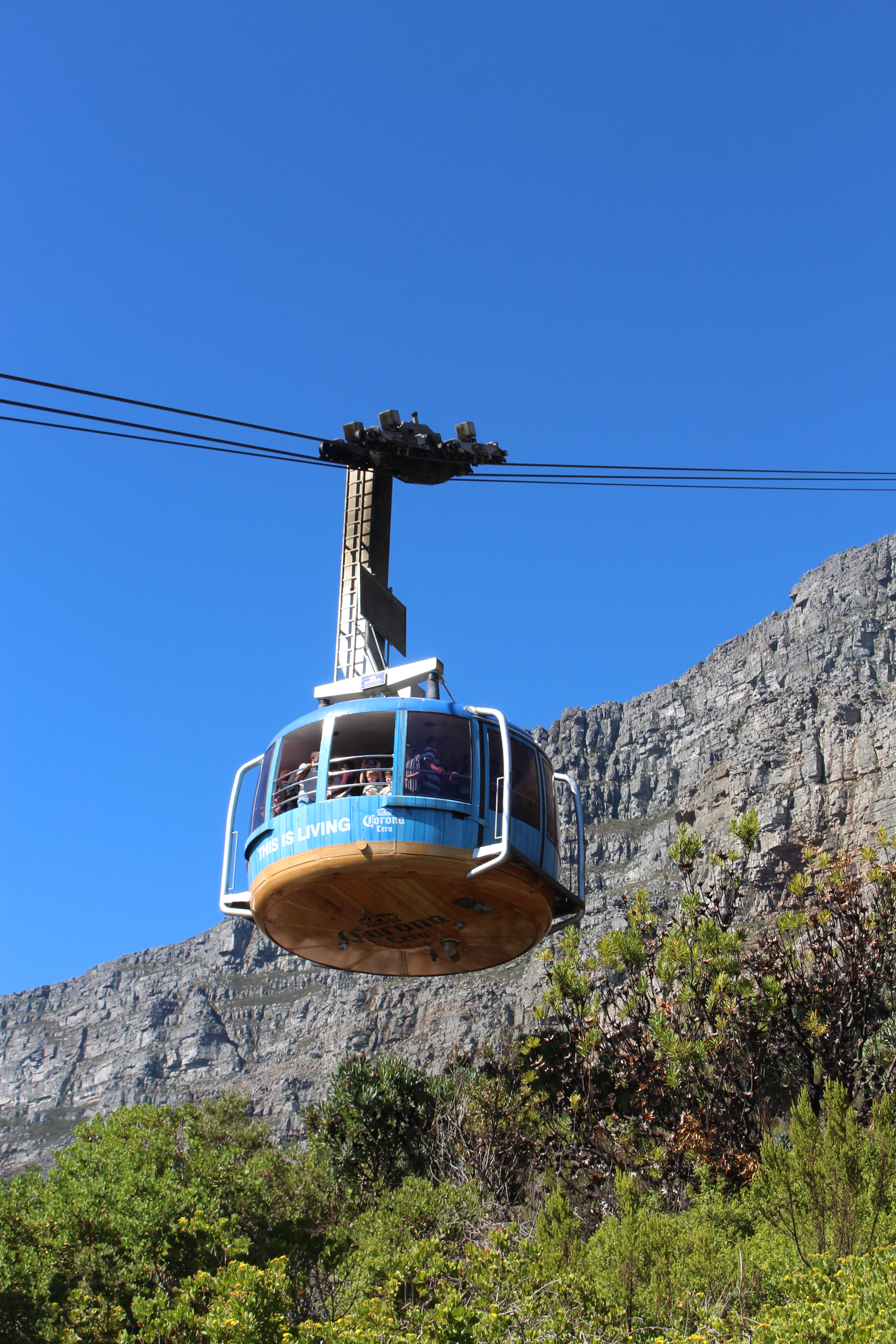
Corona sponsored cable car in April 2026

In September 2025, it was reported that TMACC 99-year lease to operate the cableway was set to expire in November of the same year, however it was renewed for 3 years by SANParks. The extension was given to avoid service interruption, while a tender process is undertaken to select the next operator.

== Specifications ==
The "Rotair" cableway was installed by Garaventa (Doppelmayr Garaventa Group) from Switzerland in 1997, the design being based on the Titlis Rotair cableway in Engelberg, Switzerland.

Each car carries 65 passengers (compared to 25 for the old cars), and runs on a double cable making them more stable in high winds, giving a faster journey of 4–5 minutes to the summit. The floors of the cars rotate through 360 degrees during the ascent or descent, giving passengers a panoramic view.

== Incidents ==
In January 2001, while on holiday with her parents in South Africa, Cara Weaver died on Table Mountain when her head became entrapped in the cableway machinery, which broke her neck.

In May 2008, passengers were stuck midair in the cable car for over 30 minutes as one of its fuses blew.

On 24 October 2024, cableway operations were suspended following a fire at the lower cableway station parking garage. A back-up lithium battery explosion was the cause of the fire. About 400 people, many of whom were tourists, were at the top of the mountain at the time.

== Gallery ==
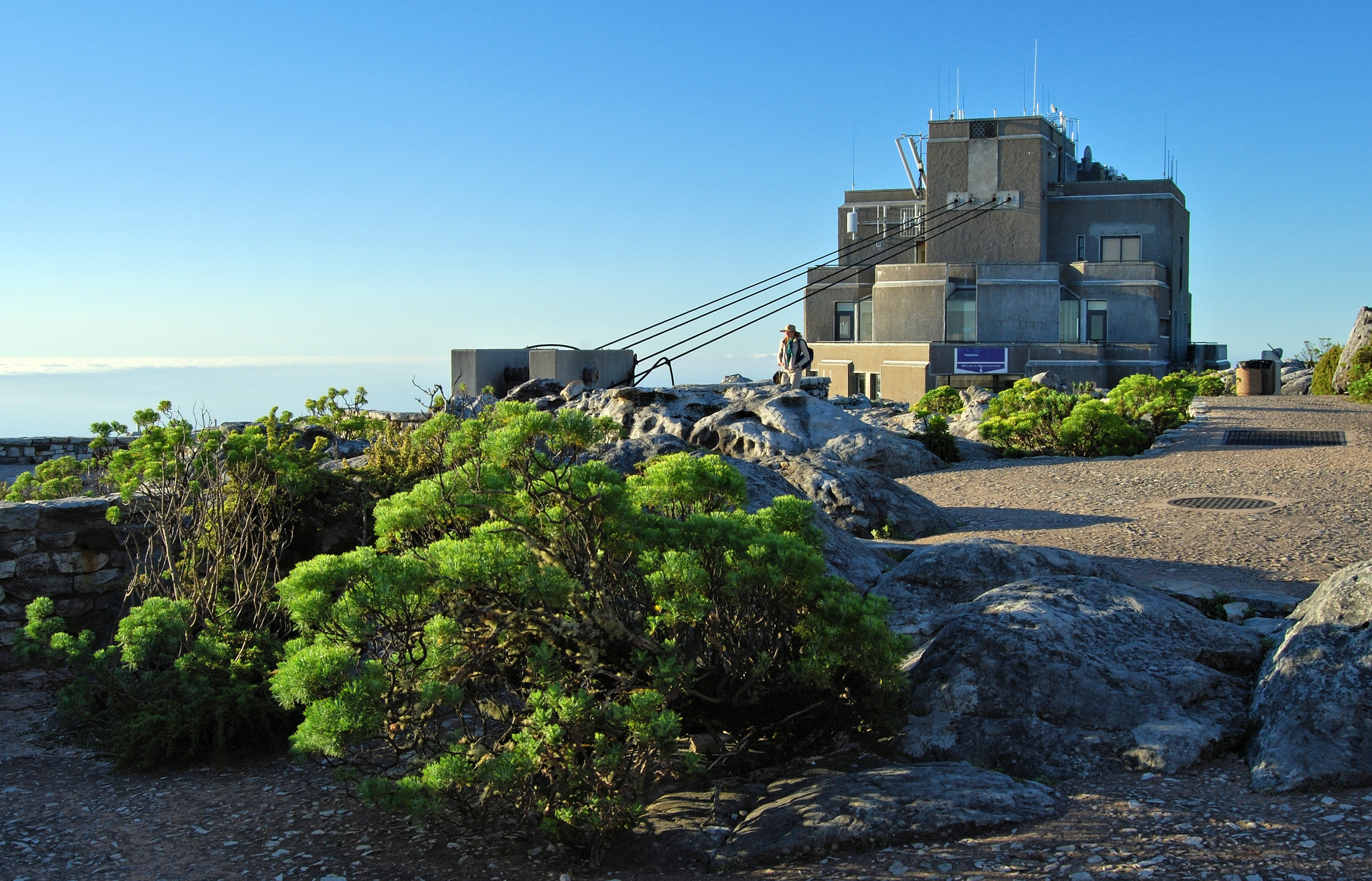
Table Mountain cableway, upper station

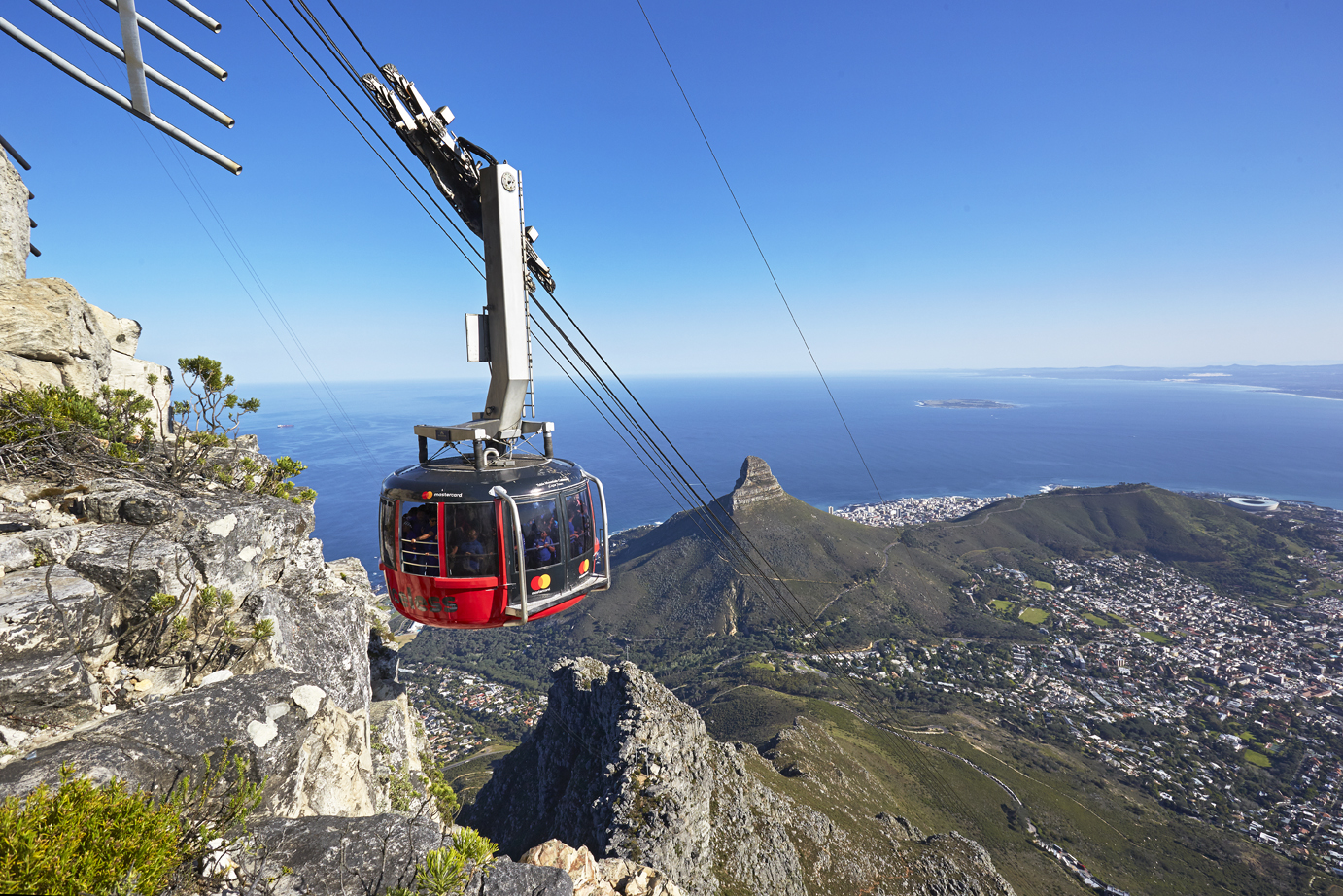
The Table Mountain Aerial Cableway cable cars are branded by MasterCard

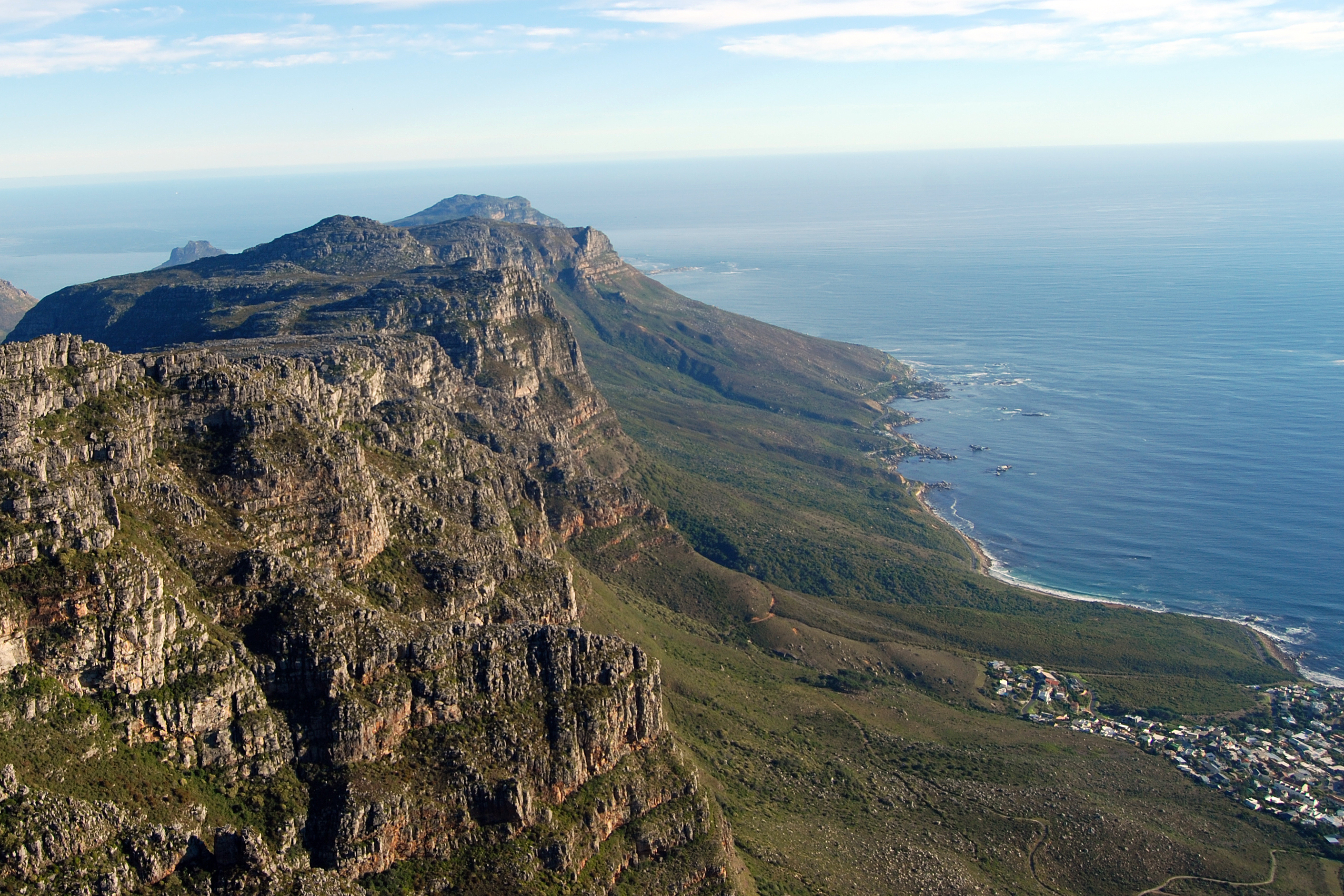
