= Krossobanen =

Aerial tramway in Rjukan, Norway

Coordinates: 59°52′50.41″N 8°32′27.64″E

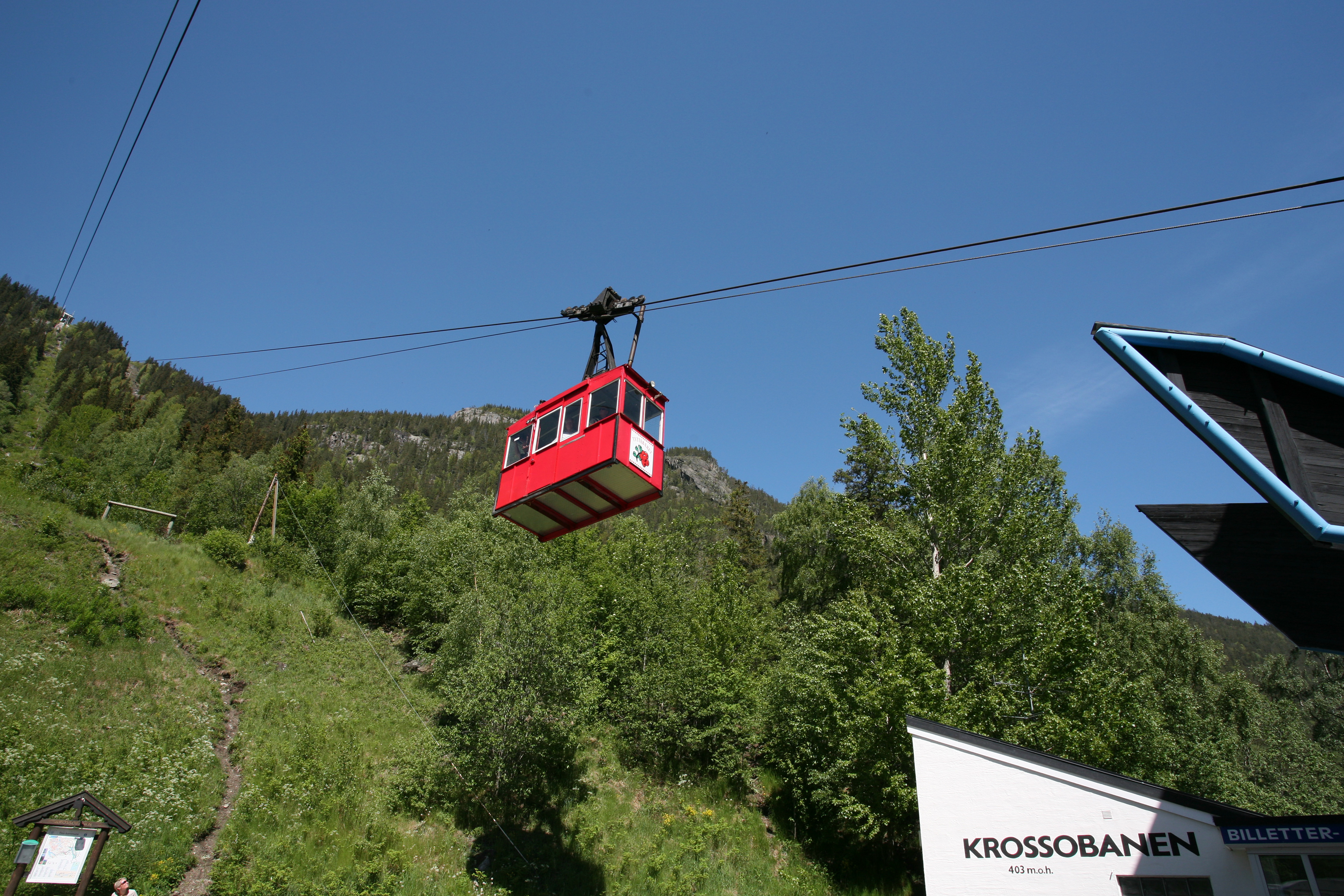

Krossobanen is an aerial tramway in Rjukan, Norway, and was the first of its kind in Northern Europe. It was built in 1928 by Bleichert as a gift from Norsk Hydro to the people of Rjukan (most of them Hydro employees), offering them a view of the sun which is obscured by the surrounding mountains during the winter months from October to March.

The horizontal distance between the lower and the upper station is 814 meters and the difference in altitude is 498 meters, which yields an average incline of 0.6: 1 (in other words, it climbs 60 centimeters for each meter traveled).
