= Alfred Zschokke =

Swiss architect (1825–1879)

- Born: Heinrich Wilhelm Alfred Zschokke; 21 April 1825; Aarau, Switzerland
- Died: 3 April 1879 (aged 53); Basel, Switzerland
- Occupation: Architect
- Spouse: Justine Zimmerli (m. 1855)
- Parent: Heinrich Zschokke (father)
- Relatives: Emil Zschokke (brother); Peter Olivier Zschokke (brother); Theodor Zschokke (brother)

Heinrich Wilhelm Alfred Zschokke (21 April 1825 – 3 April 1879) was a Swiss architect, citizen of Malans and Aarau. He served as cantonal architect of Solothurn and is known for his work on the reconstruction of Fislisbach using rammed earth construction and for several public buildings in the city of Solothurn.

== Biography ==
Zschokke was born in Aarau, the son of the writer Heinrich Zschokke, and a brother of Emil Zschokke, Peter Olivier Zschokke and Theodor Zschokke. He studied architecture in Karlsruhe, Munich and Frankfurt am Main from 1844 to 1848. In 1855 he married Justine Zimmerli, the daughter of David Zimmerli.

== Career ==
Zschokke took part in the reconstruction of the village of Fislisbach, which had been destroyed by fire in 1848, using the inexpensive rammed earth (pisé) technique. The plans he drew of the choir stalls of St. Urban's Abbey, before their dismantling in 1853, made their reconstruction possible after they were repurchased in 1911.

He served as cantonal architect of Solothurn, provisionally from 1855 and then permanently from 1861 to 1863. In this capacity he built the psychiatric clinic of Rosegg (1856–1860) and executed the plans for the Amthausplatz in Solothurn (1862). On the same square he later directed, as an independent architect, the construction of the Neo-Baroque cantonal bank building (1868–1870). Zschokke settled in Basel in 1874.

== Works ==
- Anleitung zum Pise-Bau, 1849

== Bibliography ==
- Biographisches Lexikon des Aargaus. p. 917. (BLAG)
