= Oskar Losinger =

Swiss civil engineer and construction entrepreneur

- Born: June 12, 1885; Burgdorf
- Died: March 14, 1924 (aged 38); Bern
- Occupation: Civil engineer

Oskar Losinger (12 June 1885 – 14 March 1924) was a Swiss civil engineer and co-founder of Losinger & Cie, a construction company established in Burgdorf and Bern.

== Life and career ==
Losinger was born on 12 June 1885 in Burgdorf to Albert Hermann Losinger, a merchant. He was a half-brother of Eugen Losinger. He married Jenny Ferri, daughter of Arnoldo Ferri, a physician.

Losinger attended the gymnasium in Burgdorf and studied civil engineering at the Swiss Federal Institute of Technology (ETH) in Zurich. He subsequently worked in Italy on the construction of the Centovalli railway line, before returning to Zurich in 1915. From 1917 onwards, he collaborated with Eugen Losinger on the construction of rural roads and land improvement tracks. Together they founded Losinger & Cie in Burgdorf in 1920, followed in 1921 by a general partnership of the same name in Bern, which was converted into a joint-stock company in 1922. Oskar Losinger took charge of the Zurich branch in 1921. His first major contract — the drilling of a 3.3 km penstock tunnel at Klosters (1921–1923) — marked an important early step in the company's development in civil engineering.

== Bibliography ==
- Losinger 1917–1967, 1967
- Neue Deutsche Biographie, vol. 15, 1987, pp. 197–198
- V. Losinger, Erfolg und Krise einer Unternehmung, 1992
