= Pfänder =

Mountain in Vorarlberg, Austria

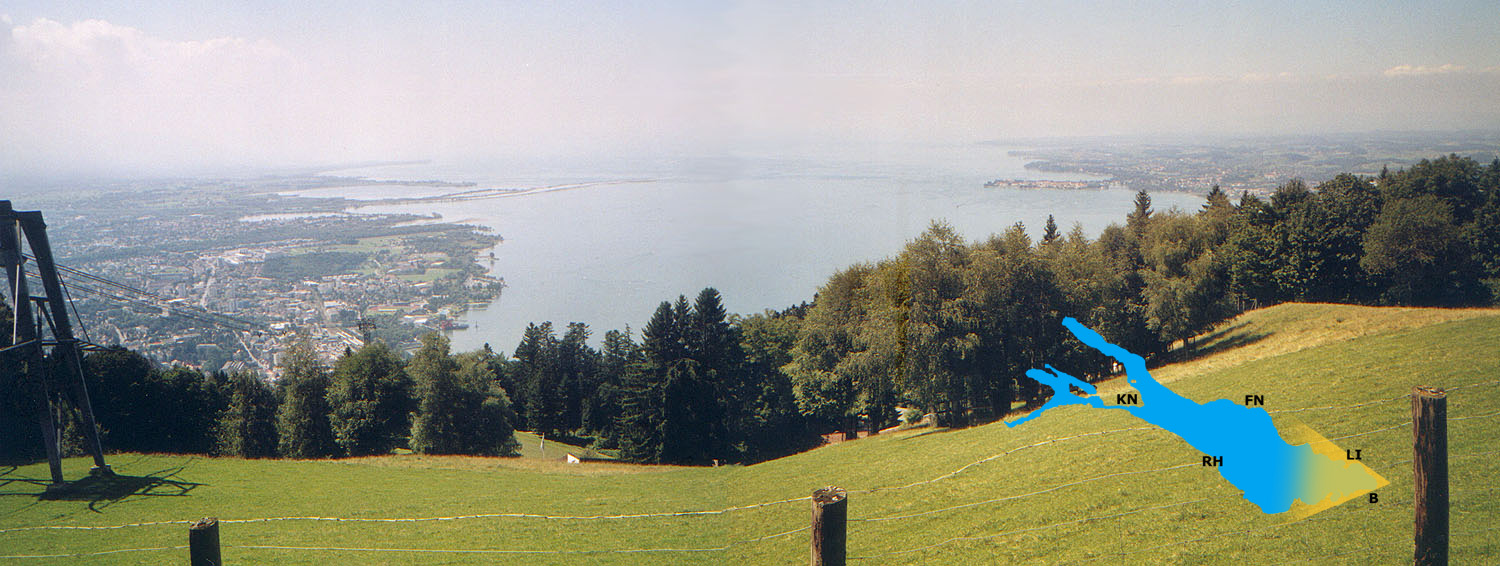

Highest point
- Elevation: 1,064 m (3,491 ft)
- Coordinates: 47°30′23″N 9°46′45″E

Geography
- Location: Vorarlberg, Austria
- Parent range: Alps
- Berghaus Pfänder, Cable car, Alpine Wildlife Park, Eagle Observatory, Kiosk, Playground

The Pfänder is a mountain in western Austria close to Lake Constance (German: Bodensee). The city of Bregenz lies at the foot of the mountain on the shores of the lake. With its views over the lake and the surrounding mountain peaks, the Pfänder is one of the most famous lookout points of the region.

With good visibility, the view from the summit reaches from the Allgäu and Lech valley Alps in the east, over to the Bregenz Forest, the steep mountain peaks of Arlberg region, Silvretta, and the Rätikon to the Swiss Alps and the foothills of the Black Forest in the west. Below is Lake Constance, surrounded by the Rhine valley and the Swabian hills.

A radio tower designated BREGENZ 1 is located near the peak of the Pfänder, standing 95 meters tall. It is operated by the Österreichische Rundfunksender (Austrian Broadcasting Services) and transmits television, DAB and analogue radio services.

The mountain is a popular tourist destination, with hiking paths, an alpine wildlife park and restaurants.

== Transport ==
The Pfänder Tunnel takes the A14 motorway underneath the Pfänder, bypassing Bregenz. This is a now a dual tunnel, having opened in July 2013.

The summit of the Pfänder can be reached by a cable car called the Pfänderbahn, with the valley station in the town of Bregenz, ca. 600 m (0.37 mi) from Bregenz Hafen and 1.2 km (0.75 mi) from Bregenz railway stations. The cable car covers a height difference of over 600 m (2,000 ft) in around 6 minutes.
