= Bleichert =

Former German wire ropeway & automobile manufacturer

Coordinates: 51.3631°N 12.3757°E

Adolf Bleichert & Co.
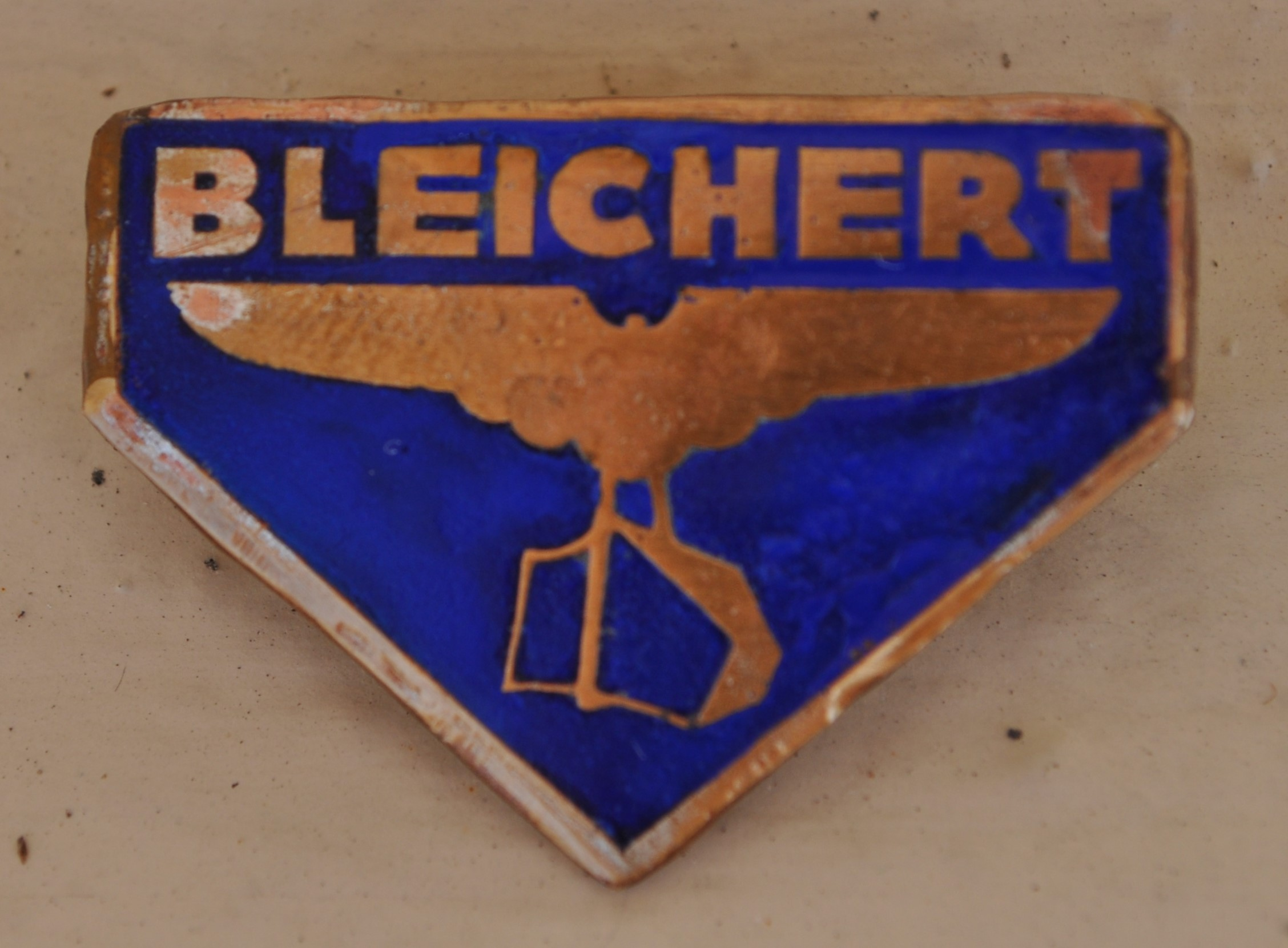
- Industry: Cable Car, Automotive Industry, Arms Industry
- Founded: 1874
- Founder: Adolf Bleichert
- Defunct: 1993
- Headquarters: Leipzig-Gohlis, Germany
- Key people: Max von Bleichert / CEO; Paul von Bleichert / CFO
- Number of employees: 90 (1881); 3,200 (1928); 169 (1932); 4,000 (1950)

Bleichert, short for Adolf Bleichert & Co., was a German engineering firm founded in 1874 by Adolf Bleichert. The company dominated the aerial wire ropeway industry during the first half of the 20th century, and its portfolio included cranes, electric cars, elevators, and mining and ship-loading equipment. It ceased operations in 1993.

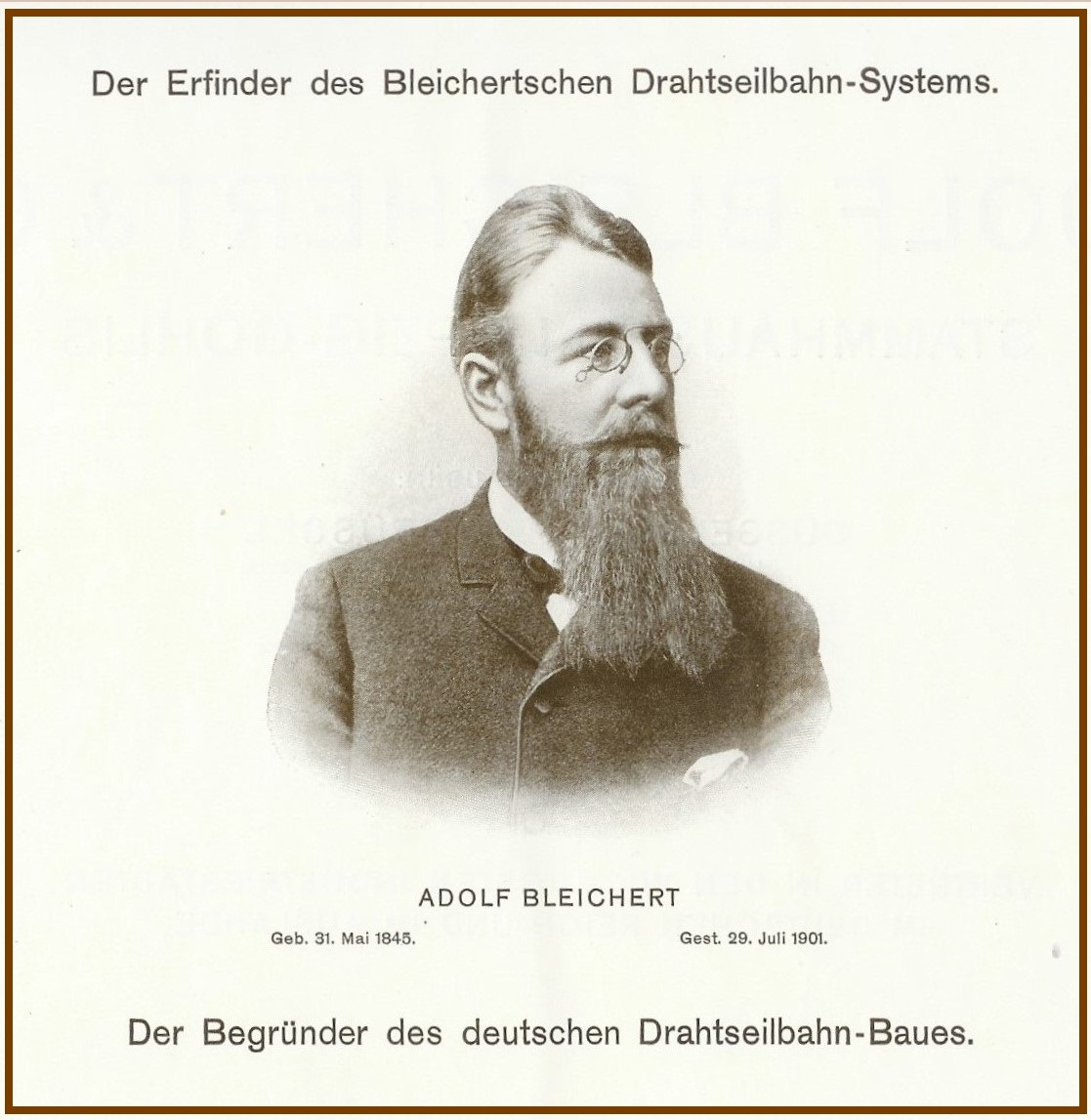
Adolf Bleichert - Founder of the Bleichert Aerial Wire Ropeway System

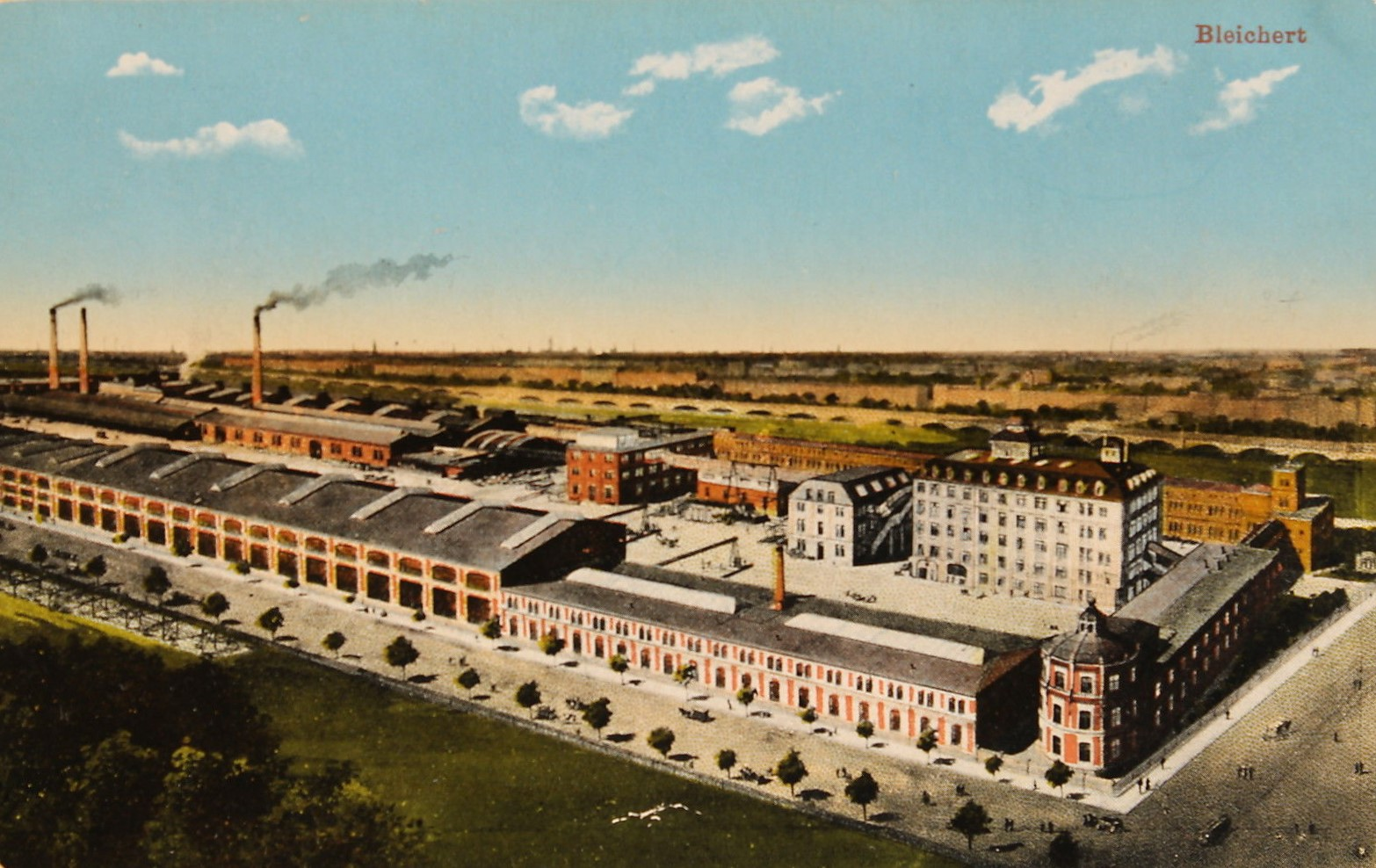
Postcard 1910 - Factory of Adolf Bleichert & Co. Leipzig-Gohlis

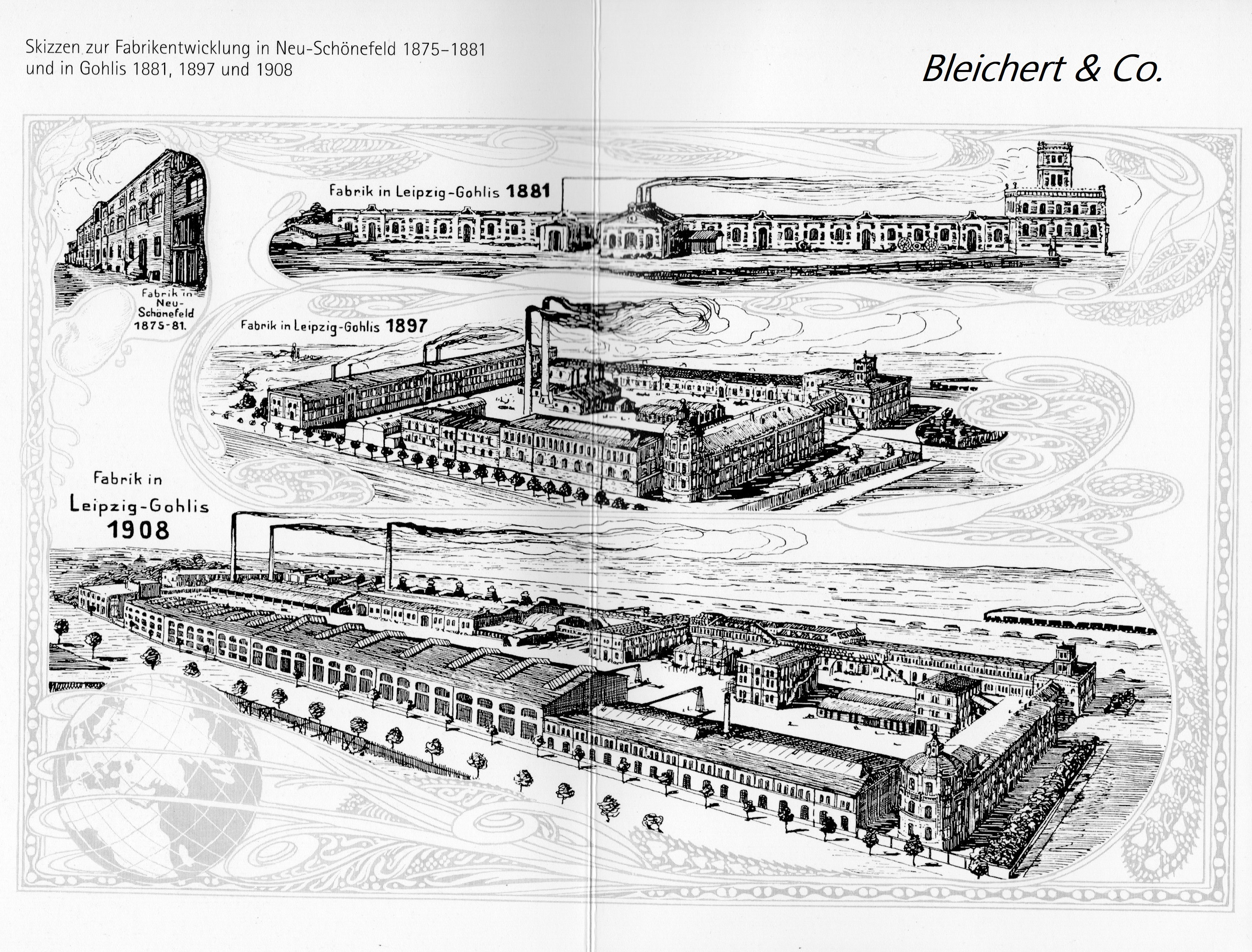
Factory plan of Adolf Bleichert & Co. Leipzig-Gohlis

== History ==
=== 1874 until 1918 ===
In 1872, Adolf Bleichert started the design and manufacture of the first wire ropeway, also known as the aerial lift, in Teutschenthal (Saxony, Germany). With the successful start-up of this installation, Adolf Bleichert and Theodor Otto founded a company for the manufacture of wire ropeways in 1874 in Gohlis, near Leipzig. This was the beginning of Adolf Bleichert & Co. which in 50 years, developed into a world-renowned company of the highest standing. In 1881, Bleichert moved its offices to Leipzig-Gohlis, which became the main factory facility located in a much bigger plant and was also the company headquarters.

Starting in 1888, Bleichert also expanded into the North American market by concluding a license agreement with the American company Cooper, Hewitt & Co., the parent company of Trenton Iron Inc., which constructed and sold many material wire ropeways based on the Bleichert system.

During World War I, the Bleichert company developed a specific field cable car used by German military forces in mountain warfare in the Vosges Mountains, the Alps, and Balkan areas. Until World War I the Bleichert company manufactured many aerial cable cars especially for material carriage, but also for passenger transportation. Among them are the following:

- 1874: Aerial cableway installation on round bar rails for the solar oil and paraffin factory in Teutschenthal near Halle, Germany
- 1876: Ropeway conveyor for the material transportation of Sayn Mine Works from the Krupp company near Bendorf, Germany
- 1880: Aerial cableway for the transportation of iron ore from theDoihl Mineto the steelworks in Rodange, Luxembourg
- 1890: Aerial cableway for wood transportation in the Baina-Buschta region, Serbia
- 1900: Aerial cableway for the mines of the Kappler Tunnel on the Schauinsland mountain in the Black Forest near Freiburg im Breisgau, Germany
- 1902: Aerial cableway for coal-mining activities at Grand-Hornu, Belgium
- 1903: Aerial cableway for coal-mining activities at the Sumitomo-Besshi Copper Mine in Niihama, Japan
- 1904: Aerial cableway for the former mining company Harpener Bergbau AG near Dortmund, Germany
- 1905: Aerial cableway for the Chilecito-La Mejicana gold mining industry, also known as the cable car from the Famatina pit, Argentina
- 1906: Aerial cableway for the nickel ore loading facility of Société Le Nickel on the pacific coast of the French overseas territory of Thio, New Caledonia
- 1906: Aerial cableway for the cement industry for Alsenschen Portland-Zementfabrik in Itzehoe–Agethorst/Wacken, Germany
- 1908: Aerial cableway for the coal-mining industry in Longyearbyen, Spitsbergen (Svalbard islands), Norway
- 1909: Aerial cableway for wood transportation of a sawmill in Mkumbara – Neu Hornow, former German East Africa
- 1909: Aerial cableway for material transportation at Toli Mines in the coal-mining district of Shandong coastal province, China
- 1913: Passenger aerial cableway (Kohlerer Bahn) in Bolzano, South Tyrol (former Austria-Hungary), Italy
- 1913: Aerial cable cranes for the construction of the Centennial Hall in Wrocław (Lower Silesia), Poland

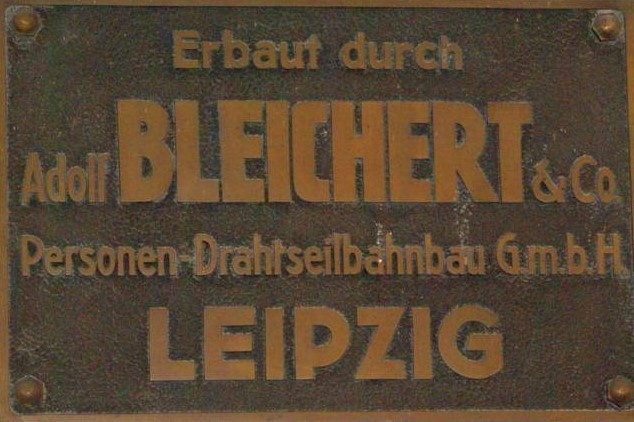
Adolf Bleichert & Co. company nameplate

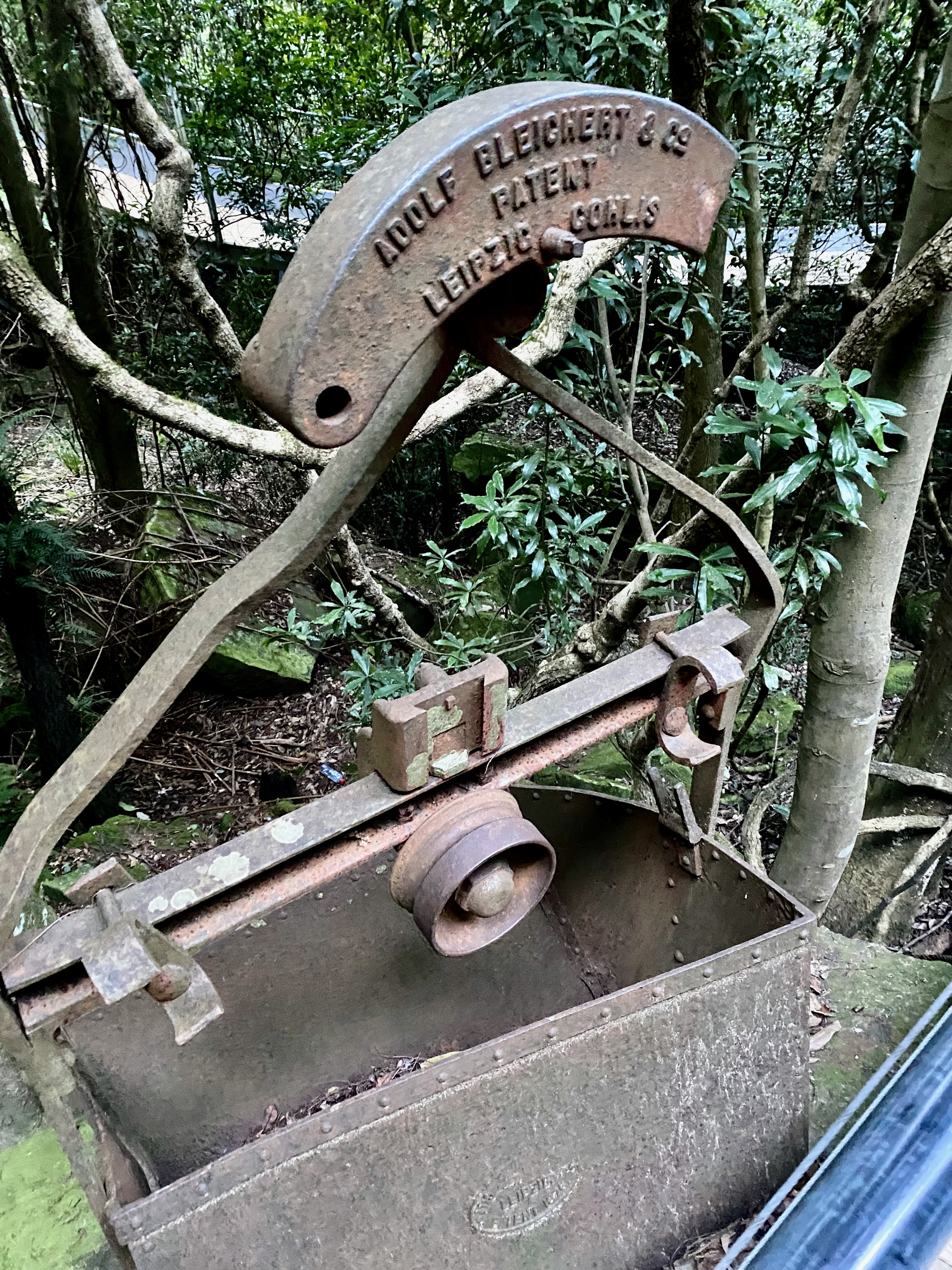
Former mining loading bucket on an aerial wire ropeway in the Blue Mountains, near Katoomba, NSW

=== 1918 until 1945 ===
Bleichert mainly built material-carrying wire ropeways, but then diversified into passenger cable cars as well, such as the famous Predigtstuhl Aerial Tramway in the Alps, the Tyrolean Zugspitze Cable Car, Krossobanen in Norway, Table Mountain Aerial Cableway in South Africa, Burgberg Cable Car in Germany, Aeri de Montserrat in Catalunya and the Port Vell Aerial Tramway crossing the Port of Barcelona from Torre Sant Sebastia via Torre Jaume I to Montjuïc.

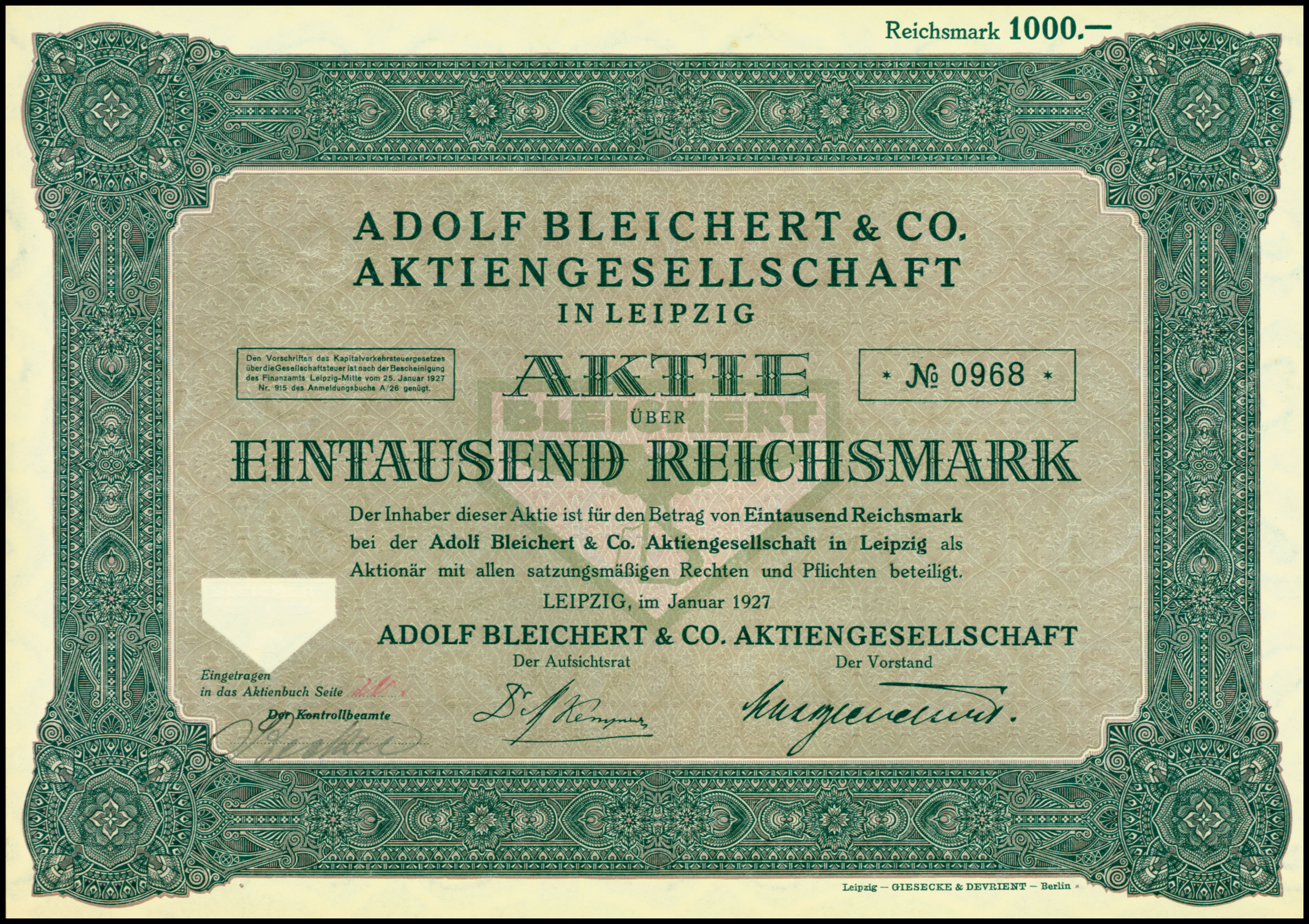
Share of the Adolf Bleichert & Co AG, issued January 1927

By the company's 50th anniversary in 1924, Adolf Bleichert & Co. had designed and built the world's record-holding wire ropeways: longest and highest elevation (Argentina), length of system over water (New Caledonia), steepest (Tanzania), highest capacity (France), northernmost (Norway), and southernmost (Chile).

In 1926, the company went public, though it was controlled by Bleichert's two sons, Max and Paul von Bleichert. Due to the Great Depression and the collapse of the German banking system, on 4 April 1932 Bleichert & Co. filed for bankruptcy. Its successor, Bleichert-Transportanlagen GmbH, was incorporated on 28 June 1932 to carry on the firm's work. Bleichert-Transportanlagen GmbH also became sole shareholder of Adolf Bleichert & Co. Drahtseilbahn GmbH, the people-mover manufacturing entity. Bleichert-Kabelbagger GmbH—the wire rope crane division—became an independent entity, though also declared bankruptcy on 4 July 1932. No longer under Bleichert family control, the Bleichert-Transportanlagen GmbH factory continued to produce during World War II.

=== From 1945 ===
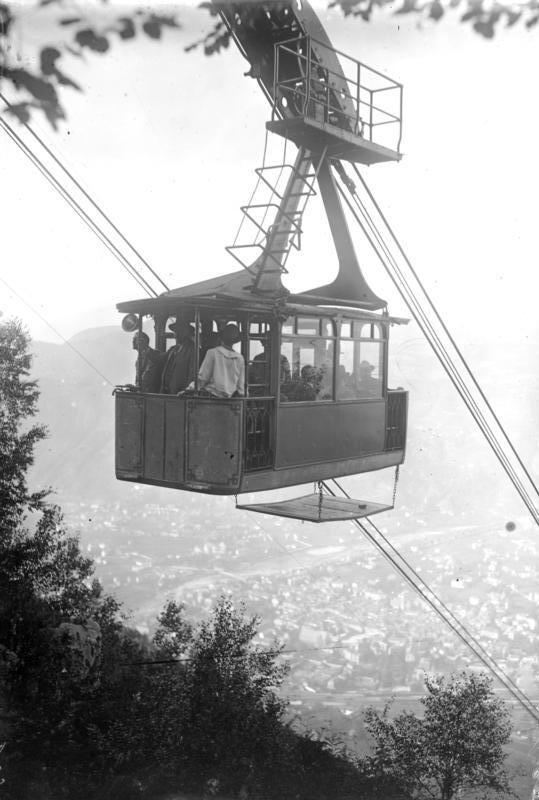
Cable car on Kohlerer mountain at Bolzano (Italy) built in 1912

With the defeat of Nazi Germany, Leipzig—the Saxon city where much of the company's factories were centered—fell on the eastern side of the Iron Curtain and Bleichert-Transportanlagen GmbH was taken over by the occupying power, the Soviet Union, and renamed SAG Bleichert. In 1954, SAG Bleichert was transferred to the German Democratic Republic (East Germany), and was renamed VEB Bleichert. Soon thereafter, the firm was continued under the name VEB Transportanlagenfabrik Bleichert Leipzig. In 1955, the company name changed again to VEB Schwermaschinenbau Verlade- und Transportanlagen Leipzig vorm.Bleichert. By 1959, the last reference to the original family business disappeared, as vorm.Bleichert was dropped from the firm's name. Between 1962 and 1985, this entity went through several iterations. However, by 1991, the company had been privatized and entered liquidation, halting production of cranes, conveyance, and pit mining equipment — thus concluding the history of the oldest and largest wire ropeway manufacturer of the world.

== See also ==
- Budde-Haus, home residence of the Bleichert family
