= Eugen Losinger =

Swiss civil engineer and builder

- Born: 21 October 1891; Burgdorf, Switzerland
- Died: 23 July 1951 (aged 59); Bern, Switzerland
- Occupations: Civil engineer, building contractor
- Spouses: Dora Alice Milliet ( 1919 (m. 1932, divorced)): Yvonne von Ernst (m. 1943)
- Relatives: Oskar Losinger (half-brother)

Eugen Losinger (21 October 1891 – 23 July 1951) was a Swiss civil engineer and building contractor. With his half-brother Oskar Losinger he founded in 1920 the construction firm Losinger & Cie., which under his sole direction from 1924 became one of the most important construction companies in Switzerland.

== Biography ==
=== Family and education ===
Eugen Losinger was born on 21 October 1891 in Burgdorf to Albert Hermann Losinger, a merchant, and Bertha Ida (née Marty). He was the half-brother of the building contractor Oskar Losinger. In 1919 he married Dora Alice Milliet, daughter of Edmund Wilhelm Milliet; the couple divorced in 1932. He married a second time in 1943, to Yvonne von Ernst, daughter of the banker Edmund von Ernst. Losinger obtained his Matura in Burgdorf in 1910 and went on to study civil engineering at the Federal Institute of Technology in Zurich, where he also worked as an assistant from 1910 to 1917 and was a member of the Helvetia student society. From 1917 to 1919 he taught at the technicum in Burgdorf.

=== Construction firm ===
In 1920, Eugen Losinger founded a construction firm together with his half-brother Oskar Losinger. After Oskar's early death in 1924, he continued the business on his own and developed it, through an extensive network of branches, into one of the most important construction companies in Switzerland. The firm's principal areas of activity were transport infrastructure and the construction of hydroelectric power plants. Among its notable transport projects were the Lorraine Bridge in Bern, the Požarevac–Kučevo railway line in Serbia, the Grindelwald–First cable car, and Kloten Airport. Its power-plant works included the dams of Oberaar in the Bernese Oberland, Sambuco and Luzzone in Ticino, Mauvoisin, Moiry and the Grande Dixence in Valais — the last of which was for a long time the highest dam in the world — as well as Pracana in Portugal.

=== Other activities ===
Active in the scout movement, Eugen Losinger served for some time as honorary treasurer of the Swiss Scout Federation.

== Bibliography ==
- V. Losinger, Erfolg und Krise einer Unternehmung, 1992.
