= Theodor Zschokke =

Swiss physician and naturalist

- Born: January 16, 1806; Aarau, Canton of Aargau
- Died: December 18, 1866 (aged 60); Aarau, Canton of Aargau
- Occupations: Physician, natural scientist, teacher
- Spouse: Julie Köchlin
- Father: Heinrich Zschokke
- Relatives: Alfred Zschokke (brother); Emil Zschokke (brother); Peter Olivier Zschokke (brother)

Theodor Zschokke (16 January 1806 – 18 December 1866) was a Swiss physician, natural scientist, and teacher based in Aarau. He was the son of the writer Heinrich Zschokke and spent much of his career as a physician and teacher of natural sciences at the cantonal school in Aarau.

== Life and career ==
Zschokke attended the cantonal school in Aarau from 1821 and completed a plumber's apprenticeship from 1822 to 1824. He then spent a year in Geneva, attending courses at the academy, before studying medicine in Munich and Berlin from 1825 onward. He received his doctorate in Berlin in 1827 and passed his examination before the Aargau health authorities in 1828. He married Julie Köchlin of Mulhouse in 1832.

He practiced as a physician in Frick from 1828 to 1830, then in Aarau from 1830. He served as garrison physician in 1831 and as district physician from 1833. From 1840 to 1866 he taught natural sciences at the cantonal school in Aarau. He was also a member of the municipal school commission from 1836 and the cantonal school commission from 1839.

Zschokke was a member of the Masonic lodge Zur Brudertreue from 1828, becoming its Worshipful Master in 1858, and was active in the Aargau Society of Natural Sciences. He wrote several treatises on natural history subjects.

== Bibliography ==
- E. Zschokke, Zur Erinnerung an Dr. med. Theodor Zschokke von Aarau, [1867] (with list of works)
- Biographisches Lexikon des Aargaus (BLAG), pp. 921–922

=== Archival sources ===
- Fonds Zschokke, Staatsarchiv Aargau (StAAG)
