= David Zimmerli =

Swiss officer and politician (1792–1875)

- Born: 19 September 1792; Aarburg, canton of Bern
- Died: 15 February 1875 (aged 82); Aarau, Switzerland
- Occupations: Military officer, politician
- Known for: Federal colonel; commander of the central military school in Thun
- Spouse: Caroline Nussbaum (m. 1830)

David Zimmerli (19 September 1792 – 15 February 1875) was a Swiss military officer and politician. After serving as an officer in the French Army and later the Dutch army, he commanded the Aargovian infantry, was made federal colonel in 1832, and later served as commander of the central military school in Thun. He was also active in cantonal and municipal politics in Aargau and Bern.

== Biography ==
Born in Aarburg on 19 September 1792, Zimmerli was the son of David Zimmerli, a miller, and Rosina Spich. He attended school in Zofingen and trained as a miller, completing his journeyman's tour from 1805 to 1810. He was a citizen of Brittnau, of Aarau (from 1834), and an honorary burgher of Reichenbach im Kandertal (from 1839). In 1830 he married Caroline Nussbaum.

== Military career ==
Zimmerli served as an officer in the French army from 1810 to 1815, and was decorated during the Russian campaign of 1812. He subsequently entered Dutch service from 1816 to 1825. Returning to Switzerland, he became chief of the Aargovian infantry from 1825 to 1835 and was promoted to federal colonel in 1832. He then served as colonel-inspector of the Bernese militia from 1835 to 1850, and as commander of the central school in Thun from 1851 to 1855.

== Civilian and political career ==
From 1854 to 1871, Zimmerli was administrator of investments for the Aargovian general savings bank (Allgemeinen Aargauischen Ersparniskasse). He sat as a deputy in the Grand Council of Aargau (1831–1835 and 1853–1856) and in the Grand Council of Bern (1839–1847). He was also a member of the executive of the city of Aarau from 1853 to 1872, serving as its president in 1852–1854 and 1855–1856.

== Bibliography ==
- Biographisches Lexikon des Aargaus (BLAG), pp. 899–900.
- L'État-major, vol. 3, pp. 203–204.

=== Archival sources ===
- Collection Schafroth, Bibliothek im Gluri-Suter-Huus (BiG).
