= Emil Zschokke =

Swiss Reformed pastor and author

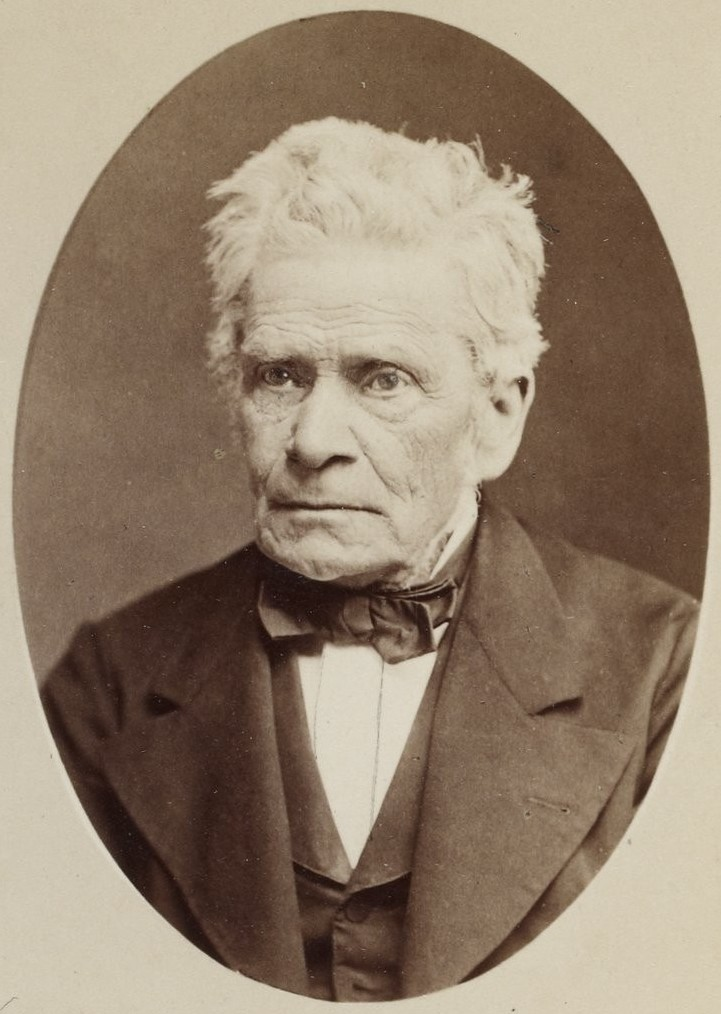
- Born: June 5, 1808; Aarau, Canton of Aargau
- Died: March 10, 1889 (aged 80); Aarau, Canton of Aargau
- Occupations: Reformed pastor, author
- Spouse: Marie Elise Offenhäuser
- Father: Heinrich Zschokke
- Relatives: Alfred Zschokke, Peter Olivier Zschokke, Theodor Zschokke

Emil Zschokke (5 June 1808 – 10 March 1889) was a Swiss pastor and author, active in the cantons of Basel-Landschaft and Aargau. Son of the writer Heinrich Zschokke, he played a role in the establishment of Basel-Landschaft as a separate canton and was a supporter of popular education and teacher training.

== Life ==
Emil Zschokke was born on 5 June 1808 in Aarau to Heinrich Zschokke and was a brother of Alfred Zschokke, Peter Olivier Zschokke, and Theodor Zschokke. In 1833 he married Marie Elise Offenhäuser, daughter of Franz Ludwig Offenhäuser, a pastor. He studied theology in Lausanne, Geneva, and Berlin from 1827, then served as a vicar in Zofingen from 1830 to 1832, followed by pastorates in Lausen (1832–1838), Liestal (1838–1845), Kulm (1845–1848), and Aarau (1849–1886).

In August 1833, Zschokke participated, unarmed, in the fighting between insurgents from the rural areas of Basel and the inhabitants of Reigoldswil, who remained loyal to the city of Basel. He supported the cause of the new Canton of Basel-Landschaft, notably as a member of the education council and as the author of its first school law (1835). Throughout his life, he worked to bring together teachers for continuing education and to promote popular instruction. In 1851, he supported the founding of what would become the Königsfelden psychiatric clinic.

== Works ==
Zschokke authored Geschichte der Entstehung des Kantons Aargau (history of the founding of the Canton of Aargau, 1853) and the Romantic poem Der heilige Gral (1872).

== Bibliography ==
=== Archival holdings ===
- Fonds, Kantonsbibliothek Aargau (KBAG) and Staatsarchiv Aargau (StAAG)

=== Selected secondary literature ===
- Allgemeine Deutsche Biographie, vol. 45, pp. 446–449
- K. Gauss, Basilea reformata, 1930, p. 168
- K. Tschudin et al., Lausen, 1963, pp. 83–89
- M. Locher, Den Verstand von unten wirken lassen, 1985
