= Friedrich Zschokke =

Swiss zoologist and parasitologist

Friedrich Zschokke (27 May 1860 – 10 January 1936) was a Swiss zoologist and parasitologist. He was the grandson of writer Heinrich Zschokke.

He was born in Aarau. He studied zoology in Lausanne and Geneva, earning his doctorate at the latter institution in 1884. In 1889 he became an associate professor, and from 1893 to 1931 was a full professor of zoology and comparative anatomy at the University of Basel. In 1900 he was named university rector.

Zschokke is best known for his work in the field of hydrobiology (lake fauna) and for his zoogeographical studies of Central European wildlife. He was an instructor to Adolf Portmann and a good friend of explorer Fridtjof Nansen. In 1927, with Portmann and Nansen, he published "Nordland: Eine Ferienfahrt nach Norwegen und Spitzbergen" (Northland, an excursion to Norway and Spitzbergen). In 1892 he became member of the Deutsche Akademie der Naturforscher Leopoldina.

He died in Basel. After his death, a donation enabled the construction of the "Zschokke house", a building located on the Gerschnialp, at the foot of the Titlis, in the ski and hiking resort of Engelberg. Today the structure is used for weekend seminars and workshops.

== Selected works ==
- Seenfauna, 1897 – Lake fauna.
- Die Tierwelt der Hochgebirgsseen, 1900 – Wildlife of high mountain lakes.
- Die Tierwelt der Schweiz in ihren Beziehungen zur Eiszeit, 1901 – Wildlife of Switzerland and its relationship to the Ice Age.
- Parasitische Würmer, 1902 – Parasitic worms.
- Die Tiefenfauna des Vierwaldstätter-Sees, 1905 – Deepwater fauna of Lake Lucerne.
- Die tiefseefauna der seen Mitteleuropas; eine geographisch-faunistische studie, 1911 – Deepwater fauna of mid-European lakes, a geographic-faunistic study.
- Der flug der tiere, 1919 – Flight of animals.
