= Heinrich Zschokke =

German-Swiss author and reformer (1771–1848)

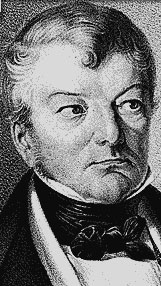
Heinrich Zschokke.

Johann Heinrich Daniel Zschokke (22 March 1771 – 27 June 1848) was a German, later Swiss, author and reformer. Most of his life was spent, and most of his reputation earned, in Switzerland. He had an extensive civil service career, and wrote histories, fiction and other works which were widely known.

== Biography ==
=== Youth and early career in Prussia ===
Born in Magdeburg, Prussia, he was educated at the monasterial (Kloster) school and at the Altstädter Gymnasium there. He ran away from school at 17, and spent some time as playwright with a company of traveling actors. Later, he studied philosophy, theology and history at the University of Frankfurt (Oder), where in 1792 he established himself as a privatdozent (associate professor or lecturer).

While a privatdozent, Zschokke created a sensation by publishing the extravagant novel, Abällino, der grosse Bandit (Abaellino, the great bandit, 1793; subsequently also dramatized), modelled on Schiller's Die Räuber, and the melodramatic tragedy Julius von Sassen (1796).

=== Move to Switzerland ===
The Prussian government declined to make him a full professor, and in 1796 Zschokke settled in Switzerland, where he ran an educational institution in the castle of Reichenau. The authorities of Graubünden granted him citizenship, and in 1798 he published his Geschichte des Freistaates der drei Bünde im hohen Rätien (Rhaetia). The political disturbances of this year compelled him to close his institution.

=== Civil service ===
He was, however, sent as a deputy to Aarau, where he was appointed president of the educational department. Soon afterward, the Helvetic executive directory sent him as government commissioner to Unterwalden for the purpose of restoring tranquility. His authority was ultimately extended over the cantons of Uri, Schwyz and Zug. Zschokke distinguished himself by the vigour of his administration and by the enthusiasm with which he devoted himself to the interests of the poorer classes of the community. In 1800, he reorganized the institutions of the Italian cantons and was appointed lieutenant-governor of the canton of Basel.

Zschokke retired from public life when the central government at Bern proposed to re-establish the federal system, but after the changes effected by Napoleon he entered the service of the canton of Aargau, with which he remained connected.

=== Writings ===
While Zschokke appeared as one of the most distinguished and energetic public men in Switzerland, he still found time to cultivate his favorite literary pursuits, and it is chiefly by his numerous writings, historical and fictitious, that he became known to the world at large. In 1801, he attracted attention by his Geschichte vom Kampfe und Untergange der schweizerischen Berg- und Wald-Kantone. Through his popular Schweizerbote (Swiss Messenger), the publication of which began in 1804, he exercised a wholesome influence on public affairs; and the like may be said of his Miscellen für die neueste Weltkunde, issued from 1807 to 1813. In 1811 he also started a monthly periodical, the Erheiterungen. In addition to his 1801 work, he wrote various other historical works, among which are Ueberlieferungen zur Geschichte unserer Zeit (Contributions to the history of our time, 1811–27) and Des Schweizerlandes Geschichte für das Schweizervolk (History of Switzerland for the Swiss people, 1822, 8th ed. 1849).

Zschokke's tales, on which his literary reputation rests, are collected in several series, Bilder aus der Schweiz (Pictures from Switzerland, 5 vols., 1824–25), Ausgewählte Novellen und Dichtungen (16 vols., 1838–39). The best known are: Addrich im Moos (1794), Der Freihof von Aarau (1794), Alamontade (1802), Jonathan Frock, Clementine, Der Creole (1830), Das Goldmacherdorf (The goldmakers' village, 1817), and Meister Jordan (1845).

In Stunden der Andacht (Hours of devotion, 1809–1816; 27 editions in Zschokke's lifetime), which was widely read, he expounded in a rationalistic spirit the fundamental principles of religion and morality. Eine Selbstschau (1842) is a kind of autobiography.

According to the 1911 Encyclopædia Britannica, "Zschokke was not a great original writer, but he secured an eminent place in the literature of his time by his enthusiasm for modern ideas in politics and religion, by the sound, practical judgment displayed in his works, and by the energy and lucidity of his style."

An edition of Zschokke's selected works, in forty volumes, was issued in 1824–28. In 1851–54 an edition in thirty-five volumes was published. A new edition of the Novellen was published by A. Vögtlin in twelve volumes (1904).

=== Later life ===
In his later years, Zschokke traveled regularly to Überlingen am Bodensee to enjoy the waters at the city's spa; he died at his country house of Blumenhalde on the Aar.
