= Hand and hitch-up services =

Municipal services in Austria and Germany

In Austria, Germany and Switzerland, hand and hitch-up services (i.e., services of manual work and with hitched-up cart or more modern vehicles, German: Hand- und Spanndienste or Hand- und Zugdienste) or more contemporary (mandatory) municipal services (German: "Gemeindedienste") or respectively corvées communales in Switzerland, are allowed in some Austrian and German states. In the 1950s in rural municipalities, citizens were drafted for mandatory community service frequently, but nowadays only small municipalities draft their citizens, like the German town of Winsen an der Aller once a year or Bezau in Austria.

== Legal basis ==
Beside several states' regulations, Hand- und Spanndienste are backed by international agreements like the agreement on the Forced Labour Convention of the International Labour Organization of 1930. The following work services, especially for military services, are exceptions of forced or compulsory labour:

- any work or service which forms part of the normal civic obligations of the citizens of a fully self-governing country;
- any work or service exacted in cases of emergency, that is to say, in the event of war, of a calamity or threatened calamity, such as fire, flood, famine, earthquake, violent epidemic or epizootic diseases, invasion by: animal, insect or vegetable pests, and in general any circumstance that would endanger the existence or the well-being of the whole or part of the population;
- minor communal services of a kind which, being performed by the members of the municipality in the direct interest of the said municipality, can therefore be considered as normal civic obligations incumbent upon the members of the municipality, provided that the members of the municipality or their direct representatives shall have the right to be consulted in regard to the need for such services.

== History ==
Hand and hitch-up services in history were services for the reduction of municipal taxes. The citizens of the municipality were required to do certain physical work, which can be summarised under the historical terms corvée or socage. They were based in Germany on the Prussian municipal tax bill of 14 July 1893 and in Austria on state law regulations.

There were different types of services:

- Hand services: The citizen must perform work with his own hands.
- Hitch-up services (of hitching up draft animals): The person must provide services with a team of horses or carriages (train cattle and dishes).
- Shovel services: construction of buildings, construction of roads, ditches

Hand and hitch-up services in history often have been done by the public. That was, for example, the setting of field bridges in the fields, the preservation of dams or even the construction of agricultural roads and local roads. The necessary materials (stones, wood, etc.) have usually been provided by the authorities.

== Hand and hitch-up services today ==
=== Austria ===
Currently, the Austrian state of Vorarlberg is executing Hand- und Zugdienste on the level of the municipalities regularly. According to the respective municipal regulations, basically there are two versions of executing the mandatory services for the drafted citizens: in some municipalities the citizens can choose, if they participate in manual work for the community or if they prefer to pay additional taxes as a substitute to the compulsory community work. In other communities, the administration transferred the work to private companies, so every citizen that is in age to be drafted, has to pay the additional substitute tax. By local law, it is determined who is obliged for Hand- und Zugdienste-services. For example, in Bürserberg, only one person per household is obliged to serve, in Bezau all male citizens between the age of 18 and 60 years.

List of Austrian municipalities drafting citizens for hand and hitch-up services (as of 2005)
municipality	municipality	municipality
Bartholomäberg	Bildstein	Möggers
Blons	Bizau	Reute
Brand	Buch	Riefensberg
Bürserberg	Damüls	Satteins
Raggal	Doren	Schröcken
Silbertal	Egg	Schwarzenberg
Sonntag	Eichenberg	Sulzberg
Alberschwende	Krumbach	Düns
Andelsbuch	Langen	Dünserberg
Bezau	Langenegg	Koblach

=== Germany ===
Even today, municipal regulations in Germany provide that municipalities may, under certain circumstances, oblige their inhabitants to carry out manual and hitch-up services, such as in Baden-Württemberg, Bavaria or Lower Saxony. They are public service obligations within the scope of the German Constitution and are not contrary to the prohibition of compulsory labor, if the following conditions are fulfilled:

- Conventionality: compulsory services are intended to reduce the payment of local taxes
- Generality: in principle, every member of the municipality is obliged to bear the municipal burdens
- Equality: every member of the municipality is obliged in the same way

=== Switzerland ===
In the Swiss canton of Fribourg, in some municipalities the corvées communales, a compulsory community service, is in force, such as the municipalities of Châtillon or Auboranges. Depending on the municipal regulations, either homeowners or the entire adult population are obliged to work a few days a year for the municipality. Those corvées communales are services to reduce municipal taxes, that obliges community citizens to do certain physical work. Anyone who does not participate must pay an additional fee.

== See also ==
- Civil conscription
- Community service
- Compulsory Border Guard Service
- Compulsory Fire Service
- Conscription in Germany
- Unfree labour
- Workfare
