= Hofrieden Court =

This district court was first mentioned for the first time in 1354, 1806 dissolved

Coordinates: 47.531387°N 9.751536°E

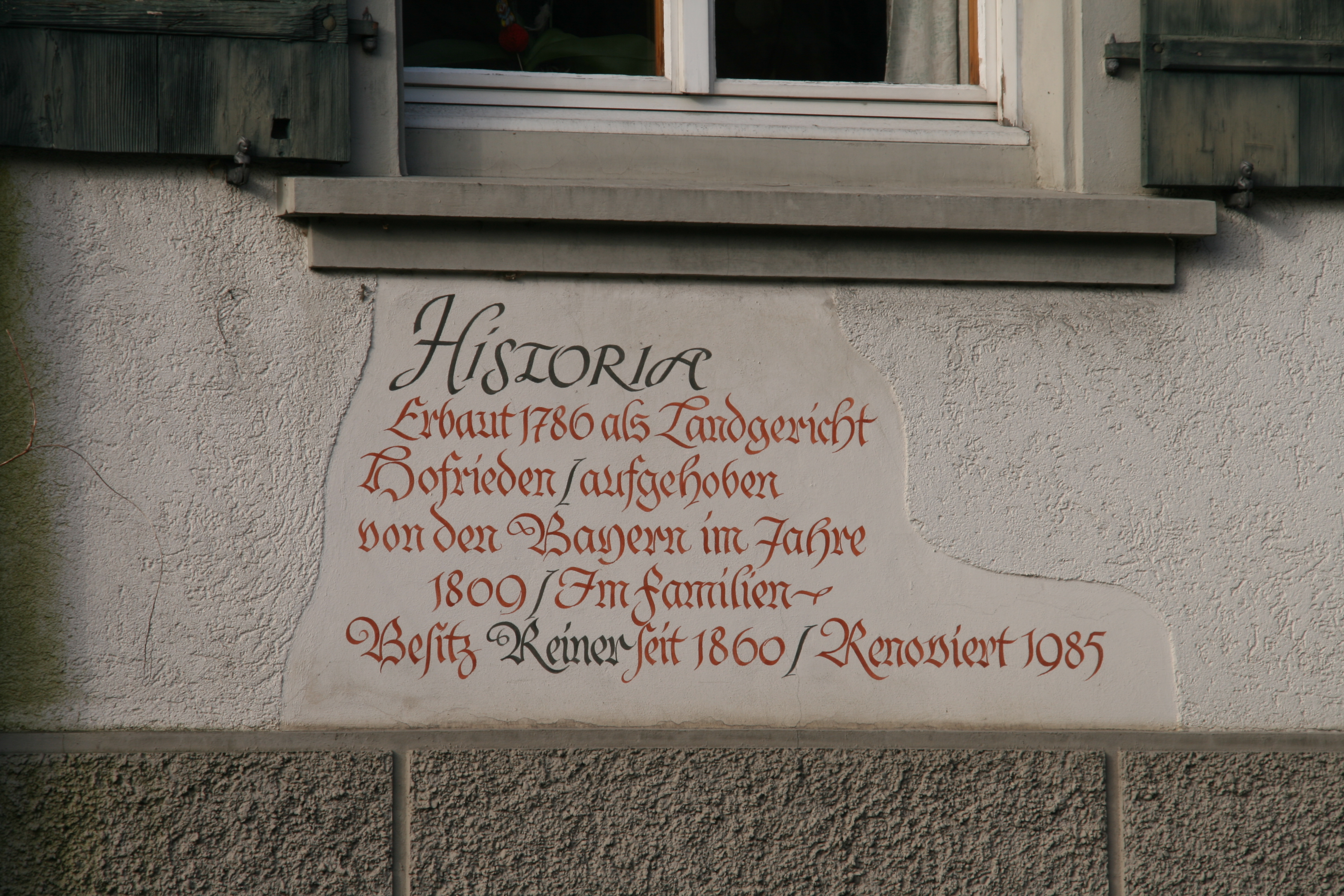
Inscription at the inn 'The Eagle'

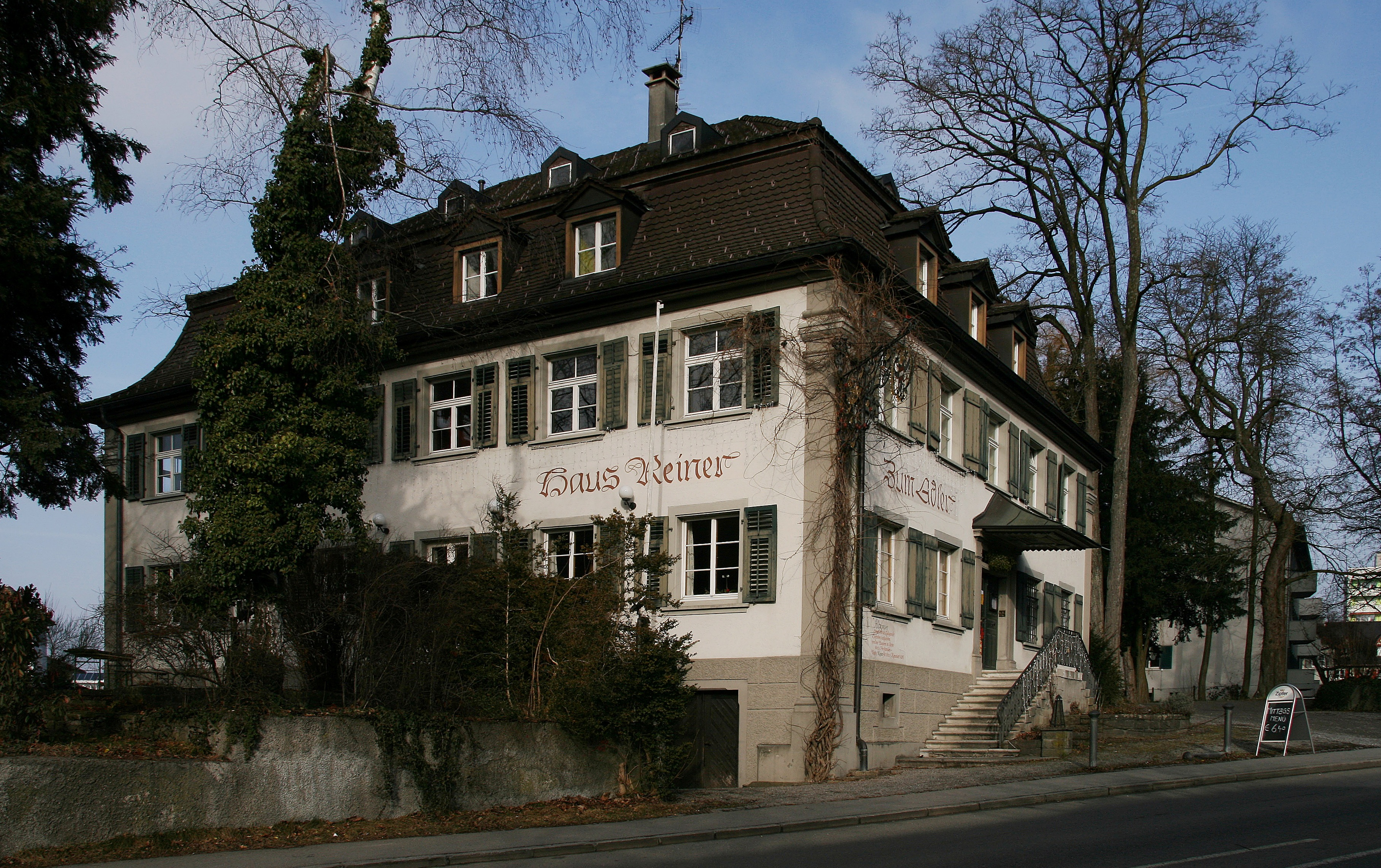
The former Courthouse, now an inn

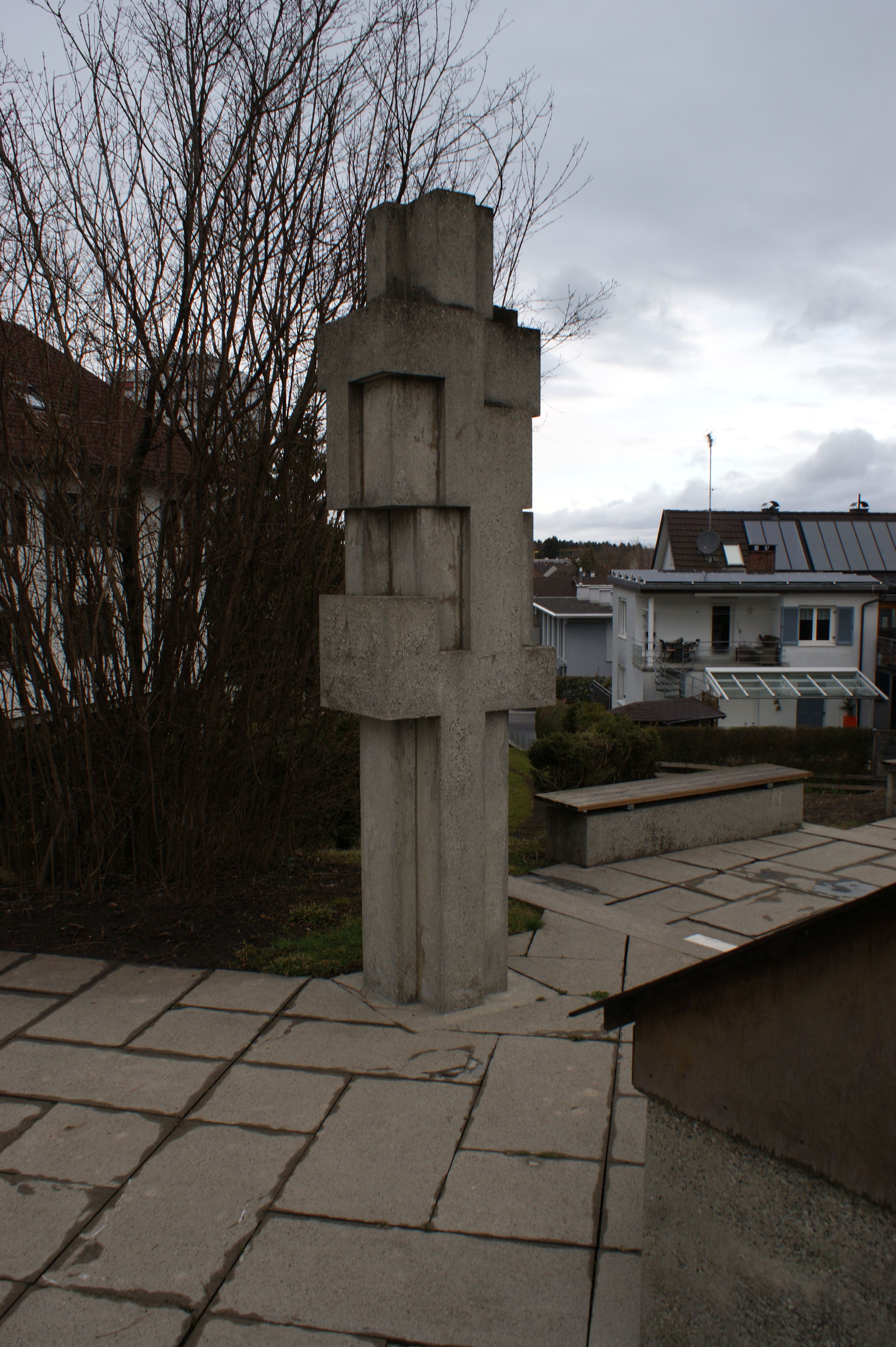
Memorial Hofrieden Court

Hofrieden Court was located in Lochau in the state of Vorarlberg (Austria) and officially mentioned in a document for the first time in 1354. It is also referred to as Hofrieden District Court, in German: Landgericht Hofrieden. This court was in existence until 1806, when the judicial circuits of that time were rendered unnecessary. It was a consequence to the fact that in the course of the Napoleonic Wars Bavaria had become the new sovereign in the area of today's Vorarlberg.

== Extent / Size ==
Hofrieden Court, a regional court, comprised the municipalities of Fluh, Hörbranz, Hohenweiler, Langen bei Bregenz, Lochau, Möggers (including Eichenberg) and Rieden bei Bregenz with „Vorkloster“ as well as Kennelbach.

The town of Bregenz reported to a different court. Concerning the responsibility of jurisdiction the line between Lochau and Bregenz was determined by a local brook called Eichholzbach for quite a long time (from 1490 to1598). Then a new border was established by a decree called 'Burgfriedenerweiterung', an expansion of truce on 28 August 1598, which was confirmed by the Austrian Emperor Rudolf II in 1602. This date marks the implementation of the Tannenbach, another local brook, also known as Triebenbach earlier on, as the new borderline. Up to our times it continues to be the natural border between the municipalities of Bregenz and Lochau.

== Judges and history ==
Up to 5 September 1523 Hofrieden Court belonged to descendants of the counts of Montfort, counts of the Tettnang-Bregenz line, and became afterwards part of the house of Habsburg. From 1523 on the castle of Mildenberg was at times the official residence of Hofrieden Court and is nowadays privately owned. At the first „Ständetag“ in Feldkirch, a meeting of professions in 1541, the participation of Hofrieden Court is mentioned. In 1553 new judicial regulations were issued.

Following the strain of the Thirty Years' War that had taken place from 1618 to 1648 and had just ended, customs duties, the 'Steckenschau', a show to evaluate vine rods, and the Hofrieden Court's right to low justice were attached to the town of Bregenz on 26 August 1654 for 9000 guilders, only ending in 1672.

In 1679 Emperor Leopold I promised in written form his subordinates of the Hofsteig court that sale, exchange, vending, distraint or similar actions whatsoever would be forbidden in the future. This was followed in 1713 by the abolition of serfdom for Hofrieden Court by Charles VI (Karl VI).

On 8 April 1695 an instruction for the executioners of the four counties in Vorarlberg - Instruction für die Scharfrichter derer Vier Herrschaften in Vorarlberg - was issued.

On 14 October 1785 Emperor Joseph II. gave order to regulate the courts. A court operating from the official residence of the corresponding bailiff elected was to be replaced by a proper court house, which also applied to Hofrieden Court. Landamann Wilhelm Rhomberg, elected judge and head of the regional community, and the twelve jurymen of the municipalities belonging to the court agreed to build the court house right in the operative centre of Hofrieden Court jurisdiction, which was the village of Lochau. In 1788 negotiations on the construction site took place, and from 1789 to 1790 the building was erected. Also see entries on Gasthaus zum Adler, a local inn by the name of 'The Eagle'.

The Peace of Pressburg, in German "Frieden von Preßburg", determined that Vorarlberg and the Tyrol as well as some other regions of Austria were assigned to Bavaria. Hofrieden Court was made void when the „Landständische Verfassung“, a constitution concerning the estates of the country, was abolished in 1806. In the following phase, some other twenty-one provincial as well as three town courts in Vorarlberg were thus closed down. Consequently, seven provincial judicial circuits were established which later on evolved into district courts.

When the quite secluded residential and farm building of Fidel Forster, an executioner of Hintermoos in Lochau burned down in 1890, it wasn't rebuilt. Nowadays, on this lot the main pillar (Pillar 1) of the Pfänderbahn, the local cable car of Bregenz, can be seen clearly from afar, as well as a small number of private buildings.

== Adjacent places of execution ==
On 9 January 1498 a court of high justice was officially mentioned in the region of „Wellenau“ where the gallows of the County of Bregenz was situated (Galgenbihl). Wellenau is a lot located before a defile called "Klause" in Lochau. Apparently executions were carried out in this spot up to the 19th century. It was here on this previous place of execution that Sir Georg Fairholme erected in 1873 Villa Fairholme, also known as Villa Wellenau. This building was taken down in 1976. In his function as bailiff Marx Sittich von Ems ordered to hang 50 peasants on oaks at a former place of execution situated by a local brook called Leiblach. These men had claimed their rights in the course of a peasant uprising. Up to our times this location is still known as 'Henkeichen' which means hanging oaks. In 1526 the leaders of these farmers, Knopf von Leubas and Kunz Wirt, were arrested, repeatedly tortured and probably executed by hanging in Wellenau, the former site where high justice rendered by the town of Bregenz was carried out.
