= Galgenbihl =

Coordinates: 47.5149375°N 9.7551339°E

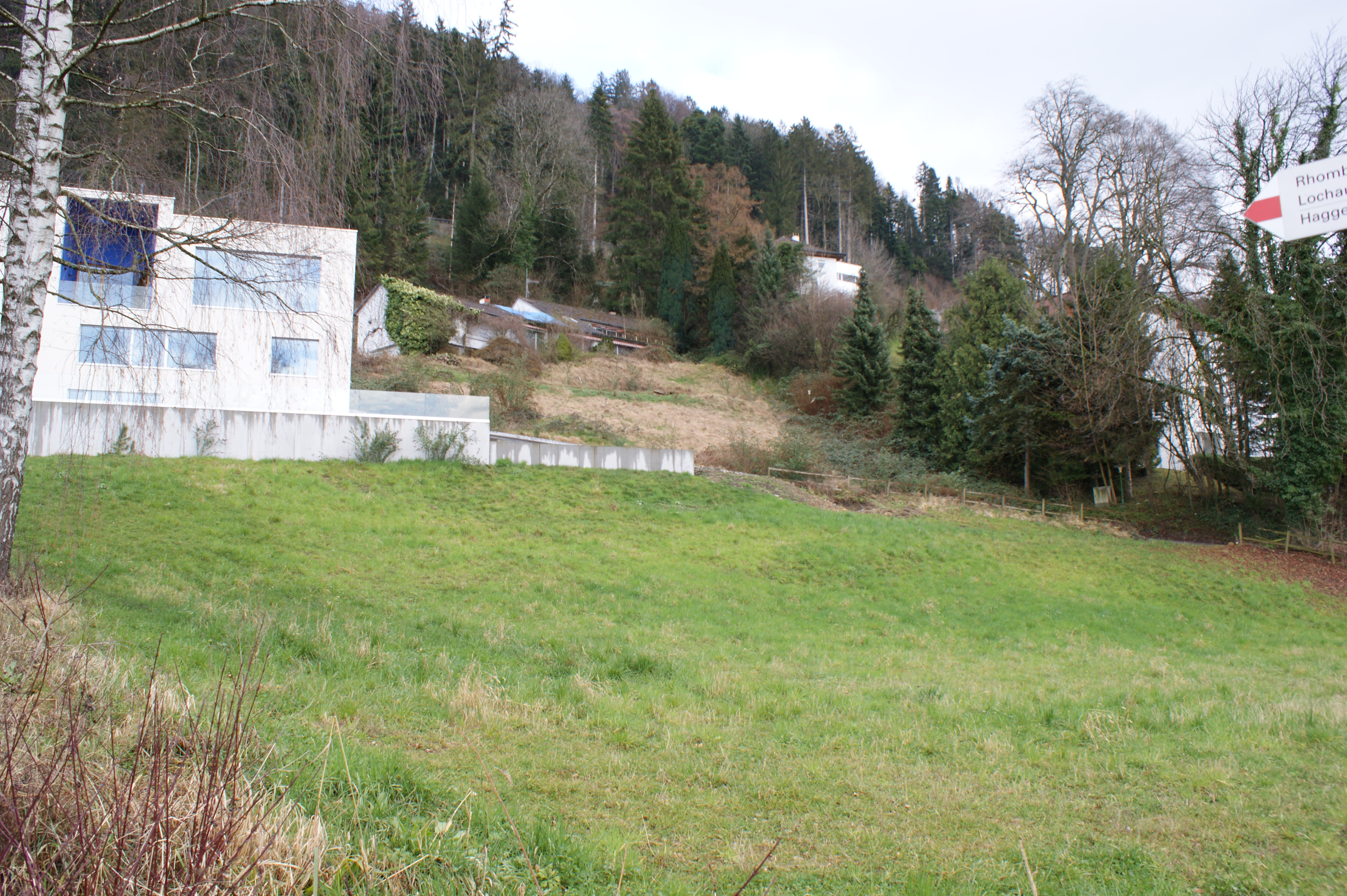
View of part of the former gallows hill of the city of Bregenz in the municipality of Lochau, only a few meters from Lake Constance

At the lot Galgenbihl (English: Gallows Hill), a former place of executions in Bregenz was the location where in earlier times people of Vorarlberg, Austria, convicted in the County of Bregenz, were executed. Synonyms in German to name such a place are e.g. Richtstätte, Richtplatz and Richtstatt, all words implying a place combined with judgement, in German: richten.

== Location ==
The former place of executions in Bregenz was then located on the southern fringe of the municipality of Lochau. At that time it belonged to Hofrieden Court on the lot Galgenbihl which is at 415 masl. Up to our times the hill is still in parts undeveloped land and shows today the buildings of Bregenzer Straße 27, 31 and 33.

The place of executions used at that time was situated outside the municipalities of Lochau and Bregenz at the very edge. However, the main road between Lochau and Bregenz running along the Klausberg respectively the defile or Klause (a bottleneck) directly passed the location. Thus, the dead bodies could easily be seen from the road by passers-by and from the Lake Constance.

Today there is no indication of how important this place had been for many centuries, neither in the form of a wayside shrine nor a commemorative plaque. Also at St. Magdalene´s Chapel or in German Kapelle St. Magdalena, which is the last station of the cross before the gallows hill or place of executions, there is no mention of it.

== History ==
No scientific research has been conducted so far on the question if at times executions in Bregenz were carried out at the site of a crime as a means of deterrence like e.g. in Vienna. At the Gericht Hofrieden (English: Hofrieden Court) in Lochau near Bregenz is recorded that executions were also carried outside of the usual place of execution. Thus Markus Sittikus von Hohenems in his function as Bailiff, 50 farmer left on an executioner's place hang on the Leiblach on oaks who claimed their rights in the context of a peasant uprising. The square there is still called "Henkeichen" (English: hangingoaks) today. In 1526 the leaders of these farmers, Knopf von Leubas and Kunz Wirt, were arrested, repeatedly tortured and probably executed at the Galgenbihl by hanging.

=== Middle Ages to the 19th century ===
In a certificate dating from 9 January 1498 a court of high justice in the region of Wellenau is mentioned. Wellenau was a lot situated before the defile in Lochau, housing the gallows belonging to the County of Bregenz. In 1643 the town of Bregenz was granted high justice which before had only been assigned to the respective Count of Bregenz in office. It is assumed that the last execution took place here on 12 December 1834 and was carried out on a murderer called Johann Georg Rohner.

In 1873 Sir Georg Fairholme built Villa Fairholme, also known as Villa Wellenau, on the former premises of the place of executions. This building was dismantled in 1976.

=== Exercise high justice ===
The Counts of Bregenz basically exercised high justice (in German: Blutgerichtsbarkeit), the right to put persons to death, because they were the sovereigns of Bregenz County. The history of origins concerning the place of executions in Bregenz remains in the dark, as is the case with many similar locations. The first executions performed at this site had not been registered and it is thus unknown how many death sentences were carried out. The first executioner (German Scharfrichter) who is particularly mentioned in Bregenz in 1565 is Meister or Master Mathis Pflug.

Under certain circumstances the dead bodies of people who had been executed were left to be seen on the gallows also in Bregenz for many years to frighten others off. This was exercised by a lot of courts of high justice in Austria and also in many parts of Europe. Thus the gallows was clearly used as a symbol of authority and power as well as to depict the form of justice that was applied. Whereas executions were more and more used by authorities objecting to the people's participation to demonstrate their power, the people themselves turned the punishment procedures and executions into fairs, where they not only witnessed the punishment of a crime, yet also took part in a process of sacrifice which cleansed society.

Executed person were buried in unholy soil, often directly in the surroundings of the gallows. The explicit order to bury the executed respectively their ashes by the gallows or in a location which had been determined before had also to do with allegedly magical effects that were believed to be connected to their remains. See also the entries e.g. on human fat (German: Menschenfett).

=== Current situation ===
The death penalty was completely abolished in Austria on February 7, 1968. The last execution in Austria (according to Allied occupation law by hanging) took place in February 1955 in the US occupation zone.
