= Doren =

- Municipality
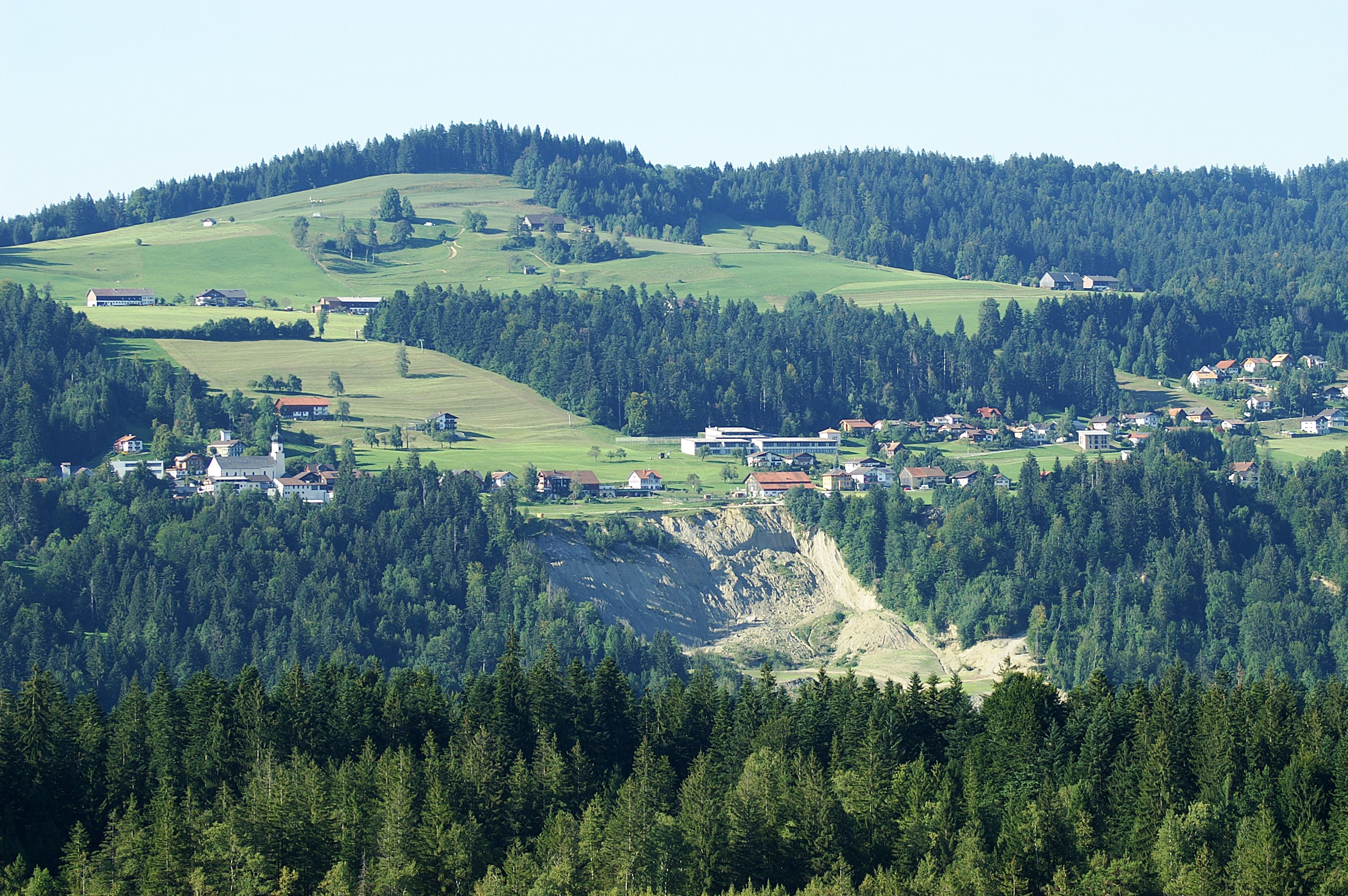

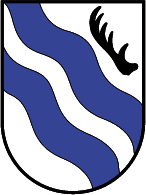
- Coat of arms

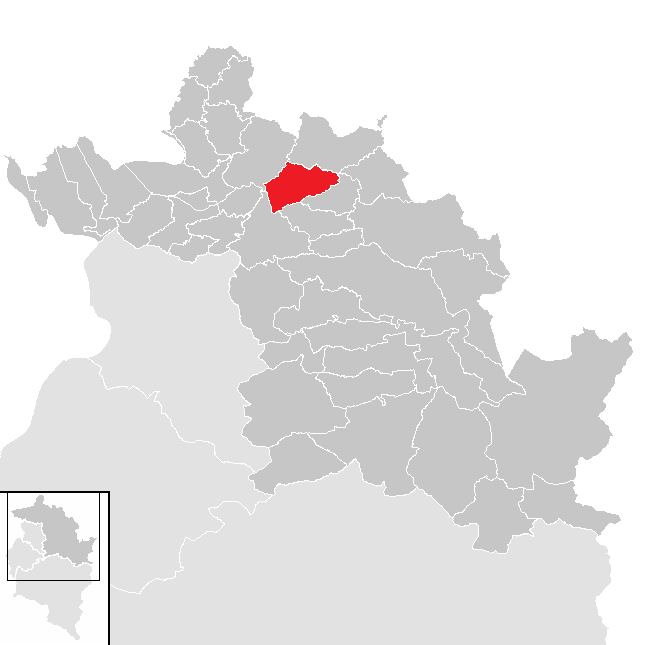
- Location in the district

- Location within Austria
- Coordinates: 47°29′00″N 09°52′00″E
- Country: Austria
- State: Vorarlberg
- District: Bregenz

Government
  - Mayor: Guido Flatz

Area
  - Total: 14.18 km^{2} (5.47 sq mi)
- Elevation: 711 m (2,333 ft)

Population (2018-01-01)
  - Total: 1,029
  - Density: 72.57/km^{2} (187.9/sq mi)
- Time zone: UTC+1 (CET)
  - Summer (DST): UTC+2 (CEST)
- Postal code: 6933
- Area code: 05516
- Vehicle registration: B
- Website: www.doren.at

Doren is a municipality in the district of Bregenz in the western Austrian state of Vorarlberg.

== Geography ==
The municipality of Doren is located in the northwest of the Bregenz Forest. It lies about two-thirds on the south side of the Sulzbergstock, which belongs to the Molasse basin, and about one third on Sulzbergstock's north side.

The community boundaries are formed by the three rivers Weißach, Bregenzer Ach, and Rotach. It also borders on five other Vorarlberg communities in the district of Bregenz (clockwise, starting in the north): Sulzberg, Krumbach, Langenegg, Alberschwende, and Langen bei Bregenz.

Doren is a member of the German-Austrian community project Naturpark Nagelfluhkette. The surrounding landscape is characterized by forests, natural monuments, numerous waterways, bogs, and biotopes.

== Culture ==
=== Parish church Doren ===
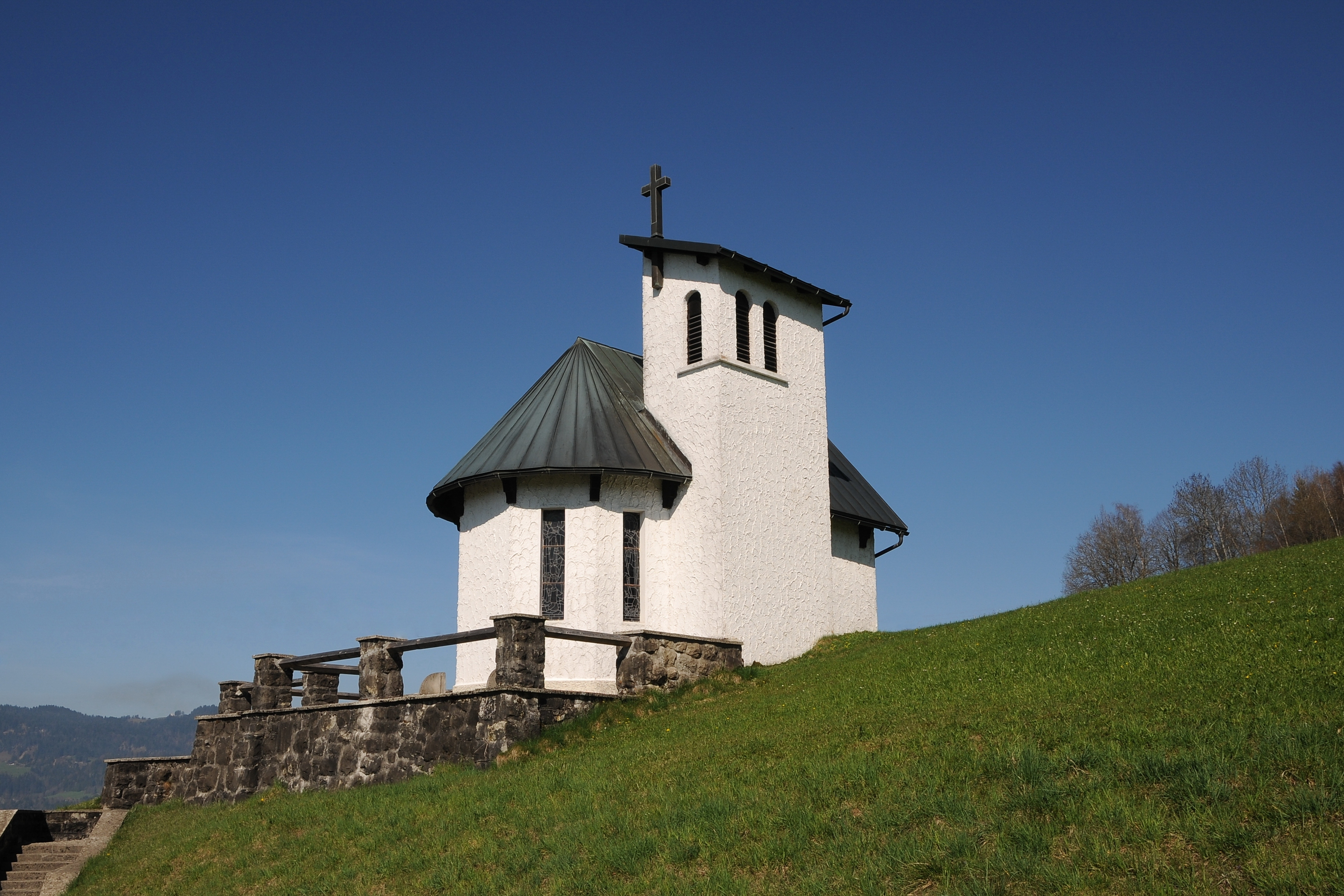
Chapel in Brenden (Doren)

In 1823, the original church was built according to the plans of the District Office Bregenz. Its consecration took place in 1826, and in 1853 it was made the parish church.

=== Coat of arms ===
The coat of arms, inspired by a design of the Schruns artist and heraldist Konrad Honold, was created in 1969. It shows the two rivers Weißach and Bregenzerach; the deer antlers stand for hunting.

== Population ==
Historical population
Year	Pop.	±%
1869	750	—
1880	675	−10.0%
1890	707	+4.7%
1900	871	+23.2%
1910	760	−12.7%
1923	733	−3.6%
1934	753	+2.7%
1939	787	+4.5%
1951	786	−0.1%
1961	783	−0.4%
1971	841	+7.4%
1981	830	−1.3%
1991	930	+12.0%
2001	1,002	+7.7%
2011	1,019	+1.7%
