= Bregenz Hafen railway station =

Railway station in Vorarlberg, Austria

Bregenz Hafen
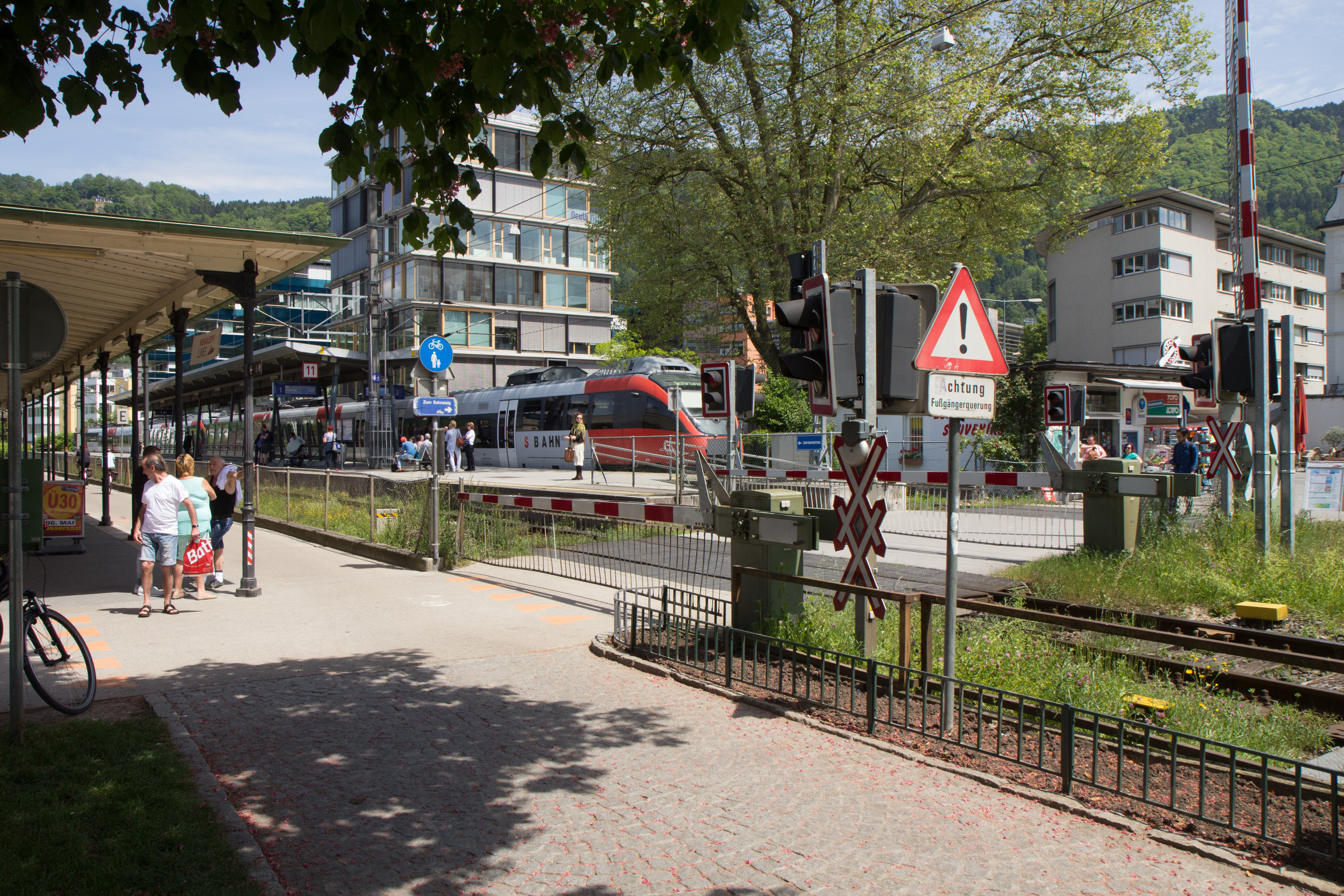
- A Vorarlberg S-Bahn service at the station in 2017

General information
- Location: Bregenz; Austria
- Coordinates: 47°30′22″N 9°44′54″E
- Owner: Austrian Federal Railways (ÖBB)
- Line: Vorarlberg line
- Train operators: ÖBB
- Connections: Lake Constance ferries

Services
| Preceding station | ÖBB | Following station |
|---|---|---|
| Bregenz towards Bludenz | REX 1 | Lochau-Hörbranz towards Lindau-Insel |
| Preceding station | Vorarlberg S-Bahn | Following station |
| Bregenz towards Bludenz | S1 | Lochau-Hörbranz towards Lindau-Insel |
| Bregenz towards St. Margrethen | S3 | Terminus |
Location
- Location within Austria Location within Vorarlberg

Bregenz Hafen railway station (German: Bahnhof Bregenz Hafen), lit. 'Bregenz harbour railway station', is a railway station in the town of Bregenz, the capital of the district of Bregenz in the Austrian state of Vorarlberg. It is adjacent to the Bregenz ferry terminal, which offers connections to various points on Lake Constance. It is an intermediate stop on the standard gauge Vorarlberg line of Austrian Federal Railways (ÖBB). The station is less than 750 metres (2,460 ft) east of Bregenz's primary railway station, at the other end of the promenade along Lake Constance. The station is served by ÖBB and Vorarlberg S-Bahn trains.

The station is located ca. 600 m (0.37 mi) away from the valley station of the Pfänderbahn, an aerial tramway to Mount Pfänder.

== Services ==
The regional following services stop at Bregenz Hafen:

| Service | Route | Frequency | Operator |
|---|---|---|---|
| REX 1 | Lindau-Insel – Lindau-Reutin – Lochau Hörbranz – Bregenz Hafen – Donrbirn – Feldkirch – Bludenz (– Vandans – Schruns) | 30 min | ÖBB, Montafonerbahn |
| S1 | Lindau-Insel – Lindau-Reutin – Bregenz Hafen – Dornbirn – Feldkirch – Bludenz | 60 min | ÖBB |
| S3 | Lochau Hörbranz – Bregenz Hafen – Bregenz – Lustenau – St. Margrethen SG | individual services | ÖBB |

== See also ==
- Rail transport in Austria
