= Bregenz District =

Coordinates: 47.4°N 10°E

Bregenz District Bezirk Bregenz
- District
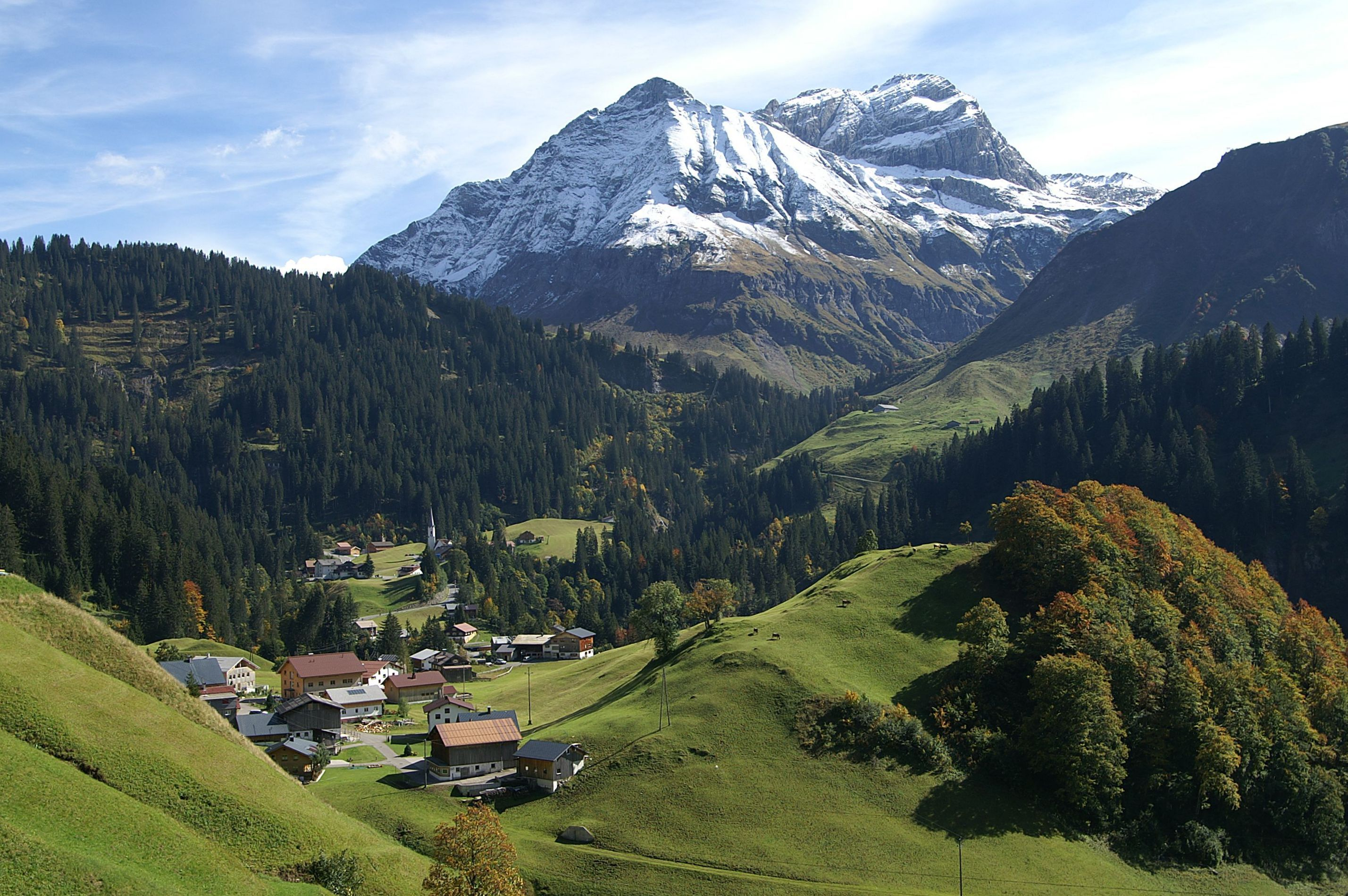
- View of Schröcken
- Country: Austria
- State: Vorarlberg
- Number of municipalities: 40
- Administrative seat: Bregenz

Government
  - District Governor: Gernot Längle

Area
  - Total: 863.37 km^{2} (333.35 sq mi)

Population (2012)
  - Total: 130,425
  - Density: 151.07/km^{2} (391.26/sq mi)
- Time zone: UTC+01:00 (CET)
  - Summer (DST): UTC+02:00 (CEST)
- Vehicle registration: B

The Bezirk Bregenz is an administrative district (Bezirk) in Vorarlberg, Austria. It comprises the Bregenz Forest region, the Leiblach valley, and the Austrian part of Lake Constance.

The area of the district is 863.37 km^{2}, its population is 130,425 (2012), and the population density is 151 people per km^{2}. The administrative centre of the district is Bregenz.

Historical population
Year	Pop.	±%
1869	41,186	—
1880	41,628	+1.1%
1890	44,864	+7.8%
1900	49,479	+10.3%
1910	53,785	+8.7%
1923	51,644	−4.0%
1934	56,304	+9.0%
1939	56,407	+0.2%
1951	70,056	+24.2%
1961	78,958	+12.7%
1971	95,235	+20.6%
1981	105,345	+10.6%
1991	115,500	+9.6%
2001	121,123	+4.9%
Source: Statistik Austria

== Administrative divisions ==
The district is divided into 40 municipalities, one of them is a town, and six are market towns.

=== Towns ===
1. Bregenz (28,012)

=== Market towns ===
1. Bezau (1,976)
2. Egg (3,452)
3. Hard (12,696)
4. Hörbranz (6,357)
5. Lauterach (9,612)
6. Wolfurt (8,173)

=== Municipalities ===
1. Alberschwende (3,139)
2. Andelsbuch (2,356)
3. Au (1,684)
4. Bildstein (714)
5. Bizau (1,015)
6. Buch (556)
7. Damüls (324)
8. Doren (1,024)
9. Eichenberg (379)
10. Fußach (3,726)
11. Gaißau (1,700)
12. Hittisau (1,852)
13. Höchst (7,764)
14. Hohenweiler (1,261)
15. Kennelbach (1,860)
16. Krumbach (2,252)
17. Langen (1,300)
18. Langenegg (1,066)
19. Lingenau (1,341)
20. Lochau (5,490)
21. Mellau (1,311)
22. Mittelberg (5,013)
23. Möggers (517)
24. Reuthe (611)
25. Riefensberg (1,024)
26. Schnepfau (472)
27. Schoppernau (934)
28. Schröcken (228)
29. Schwarzach (3,746)
30. Schwarzenberg (1,822)
31. Sibratsgfäll (395)
32. Sulzberg (1,760)
33. Warth (1,521)

(population numbers 2012)
