= Leiblach =

River in Austria and Germany

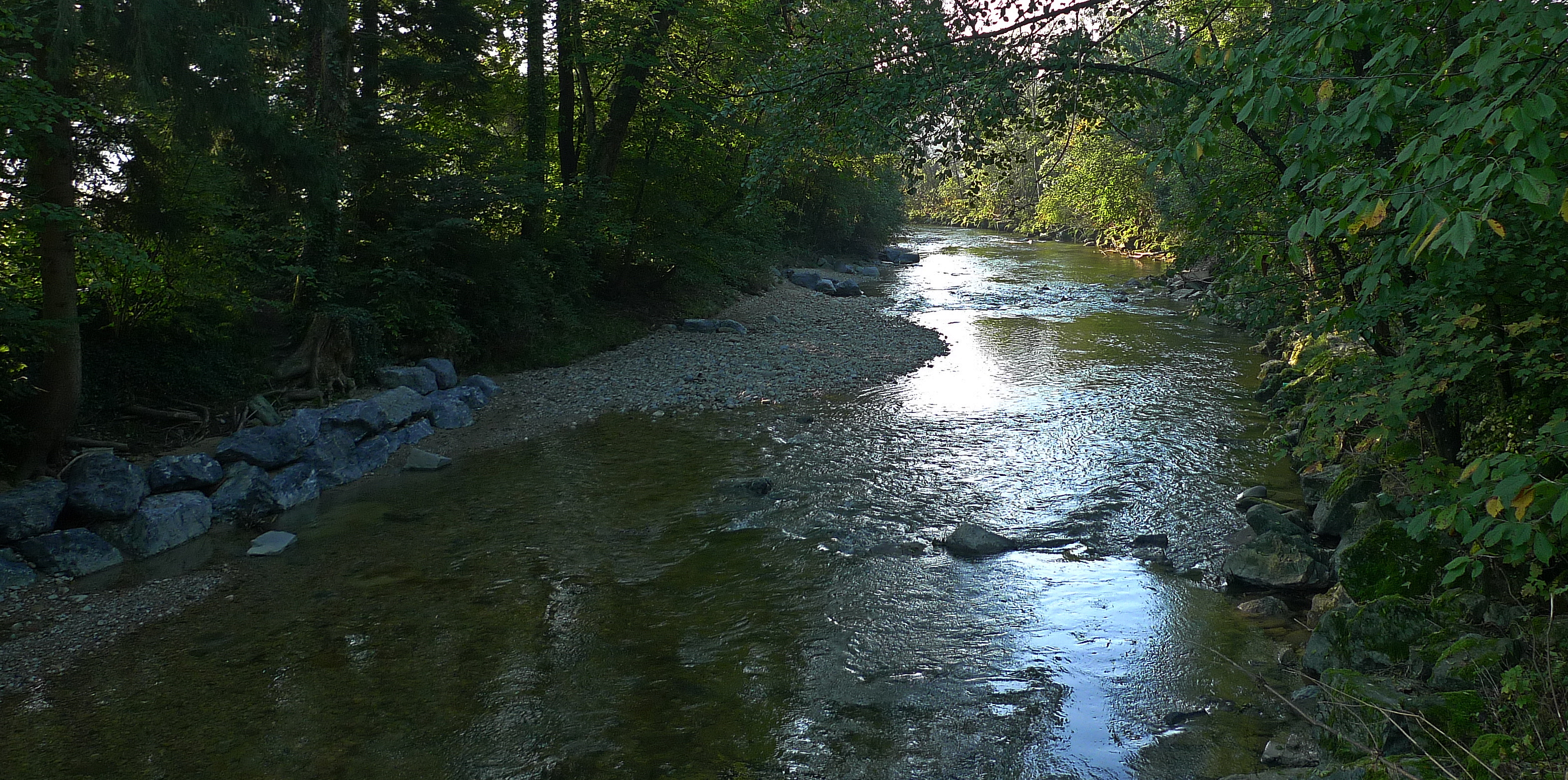
- The Leiblach near Hörbranz

Location
- Countries: Germany and Austria
- States: Bavaria and Vorarlberg

Physical characteristics
- Source
  - coordinates: 47°38′9″N 9°55′13″E
  - elevation: 692 m (2,270 ft)
- Mouth
  - location: Lake Constance
  - coordinates: 47°32′0″N 9°43′41″E
  - elevation: 395 m (1,296 ft)
- Length: 34.2 km (21.3 mi)
- Basin size: 112 km^{2} (43 sq mi)

Basin features
- Progression: Rhine→ North Sea

The Leiblach is a 34-kilometre-long (21 mi) tributary of Lake Constance (Obersee) and the Rhine, respectively. It forms the Austria–Germany border near the lake.

== Geography ==
The Leiblach source is near the German municipality of Heimenkirch, flowing to the southwest. Near the Austrian town of Hohenweiler, the river joins a small tributary, the Rickenbach. This tributary forms a part of the Austrian-German border, and below the confluence the border continues to follow the Leiblach until it eventually empties into Lake Constance between the German town of Lindau and the Austrian village of Lochau.

== See also ==
- List of rivers of Austria
- List of rivers of Germany
  - List of rivers of Bavaria
