= Lochau-Hörbranz railway station =

Railway station in Vorarlberg, Austria

Lochau-Hörbranz
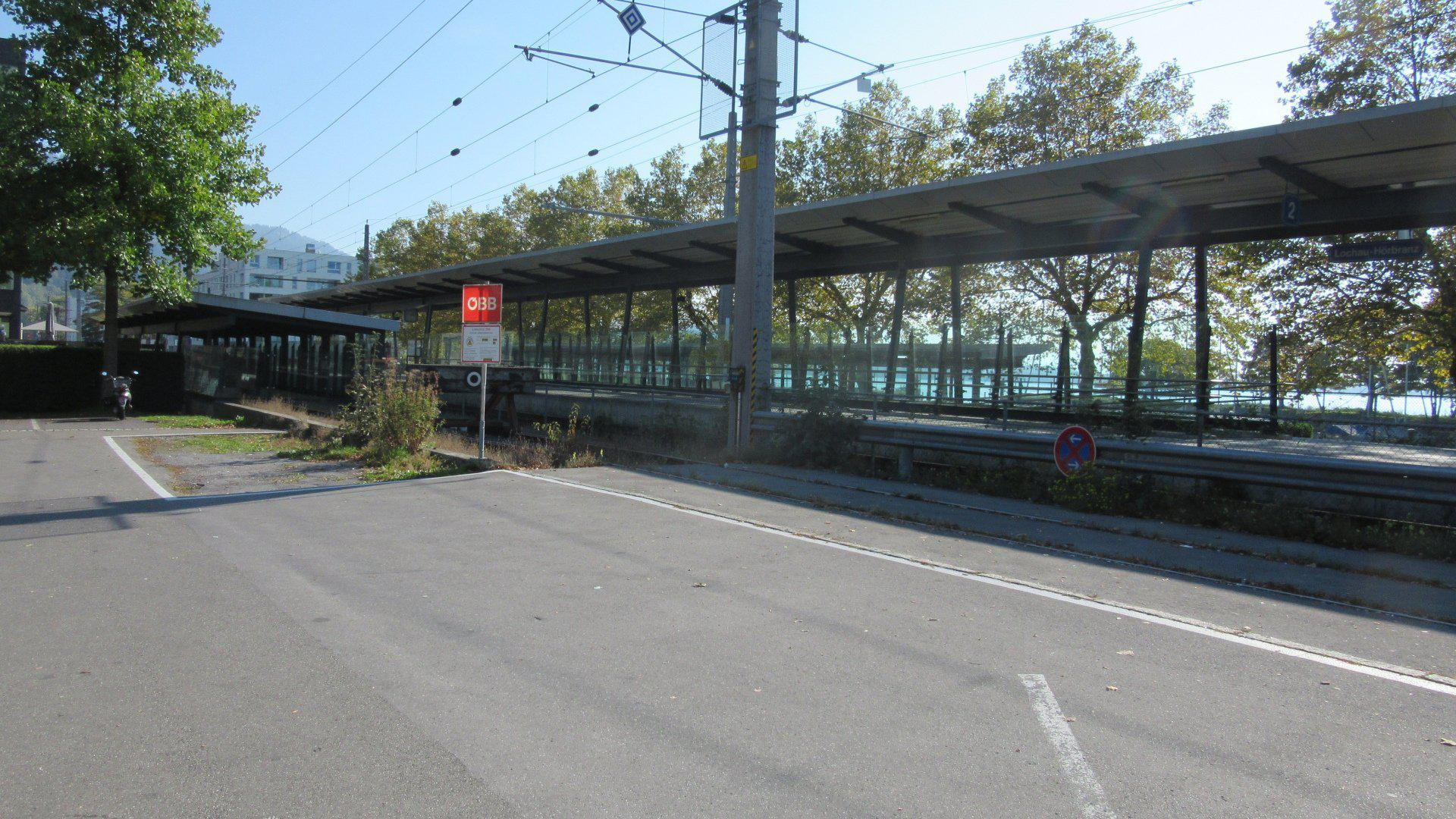
- The station platform in 2018

General information
- Location: Lochau; Austria
- Coordinates: 47°31′45″N 9°44′34″E
- Owner: Austrian Federal Railways (ÖBB)
- Line: Vorarlberg line
- Train operators: ÖBB

Services
Preceding station	ÖBB	Following station
Bregenz Hafen towards Bludenz	REX 1	Lindau-Reutin towards Lindau-Insel
Preceding station	Vorarlberg S-Bahn	Following station
Bregenz Hafen towards Bludenz	S1	Lindau-Reutin towards Lindau-Insel
Location
- Location within Austria Location within Vorarlberg

Lochau-Hörbranz railway station (German: Bahnhof Lochau-Hörbranz) is a railway station in the municipality of Lochau, in the Austrian state of Vorarlberg. It is an intermediate stop on the standard gauge Vorarlberg line of Austrian Federal Railways (ÖBB) and serves the towns of Lochau and Hörbranz. The station is served by regional express (REX 1) and Vorarlberg S-Bahn trains, both operated by ÖBB.

== Services ==
The following services stop at Lochau-Hörbranz:

- REX 1: hourly to half-hourly service between Feldkirch and Lindau-Insel; many trains continue from Feldkirch to Bludenz.
- Vorarlberg S-Bahn: S1: half-hourly service to Bludenz and less than hourly service to Lindau-Insel.

== See also ==
- Rail transport in Austria
