= Buch, Austria =

Buch
- Municipality
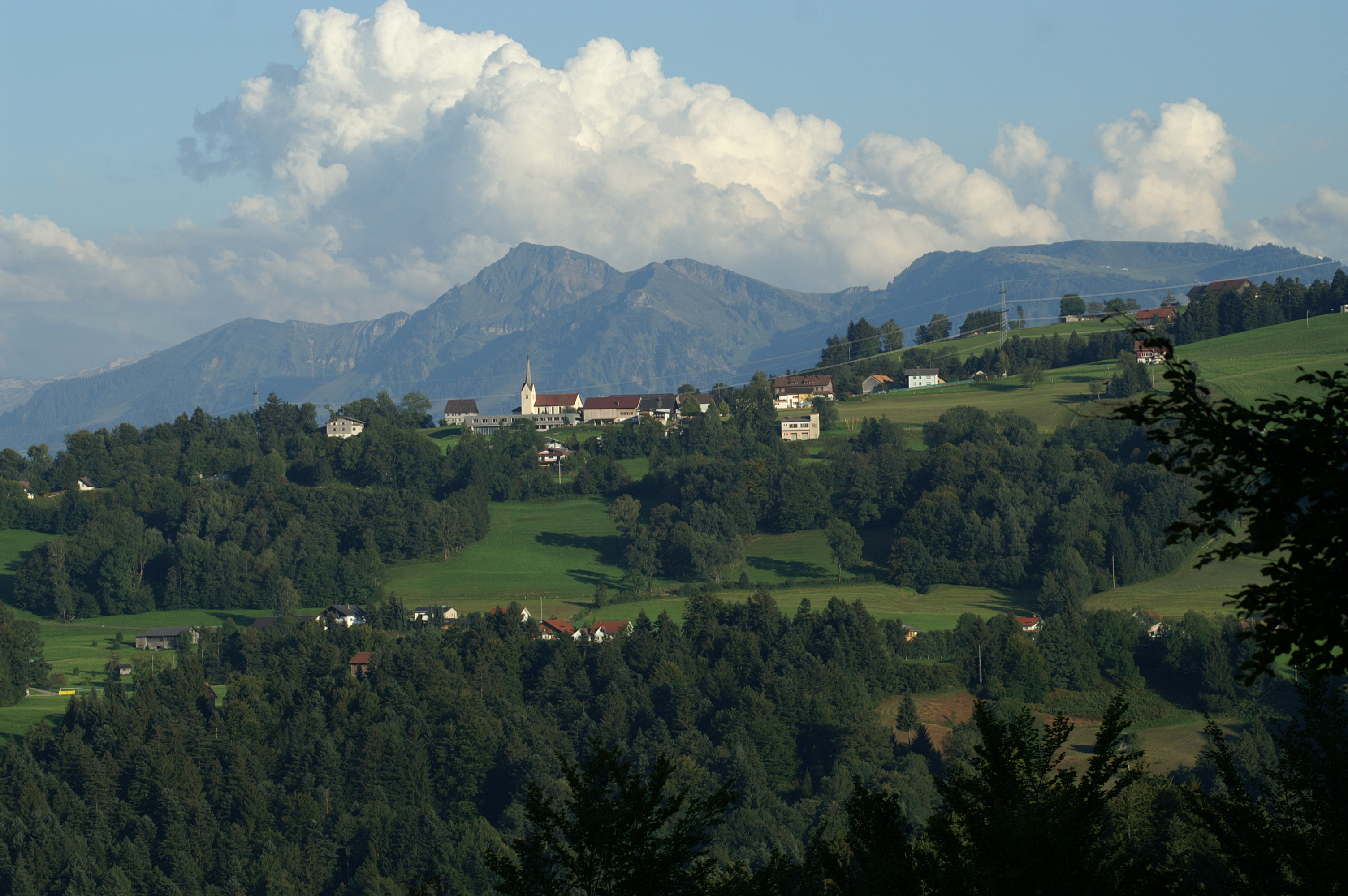

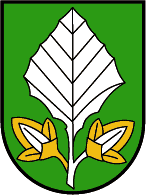
- Coat of arms

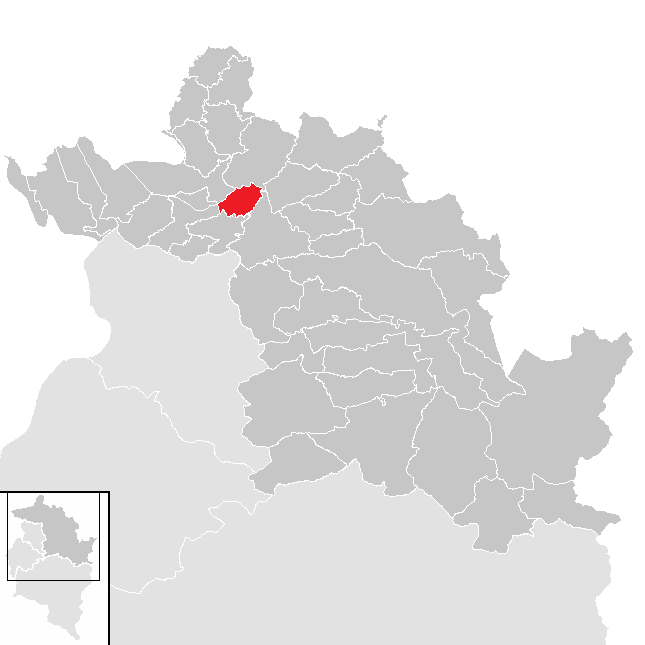
- Location in the district

- Location within Austria
- Coordinates: 47°28′55″N 09°49′06″E
- Country: Austria
- State: Vorarlberg
- District: Bregenz

Government
  - Mayor: Franz Martin (GLB)

Area
  - Total: 6.15 km^{2} (2.37 sq mi)
- Elevation: 725 m (2,379 ft)

Population (2018-01-01)
  - Total: 596
  - Density: 96.9/km^{2} (251/sq mi)
- Time zone: UTC+1 (CET)
  - Summer (DST): UTC+2 (CEST)
- Postal code: 6960
- Area code: 05579
- Vehicle registration: B
- Website: www.gemeinde-buch.at

Buch (German pronunciation: [buːx]) is a municipality in the district of Bregenz in the Austrian state of Vorarlberg.

== Population ==
Historical population
| Year | Pop. | ±% |
|---|---|---|
| 1869 | 372 | — |
| 1880 | 387 | +4.0% |
| 1890 | 308 | −20.4% |
| 1900 | 316 | +2.6% |
| 1910 | 341 | +7.9% |
| 1923 | 322 | −5.6% |
| 1934 | 337 | +4.7% |
| 1939 | 310 | −8.0% |
| 1951 | 364 | +17.4% |
| 1961 | 360 | −1.1% |
| 1971 | 441 | +22.5% |
| 1981 | 503 | +14.1% |
| 1991 | 533 | +6.0% |
| 2001 | 558 | +4.7% |
| 2011 | 546 | −2.2% |
