= Bizau =

- Municipality
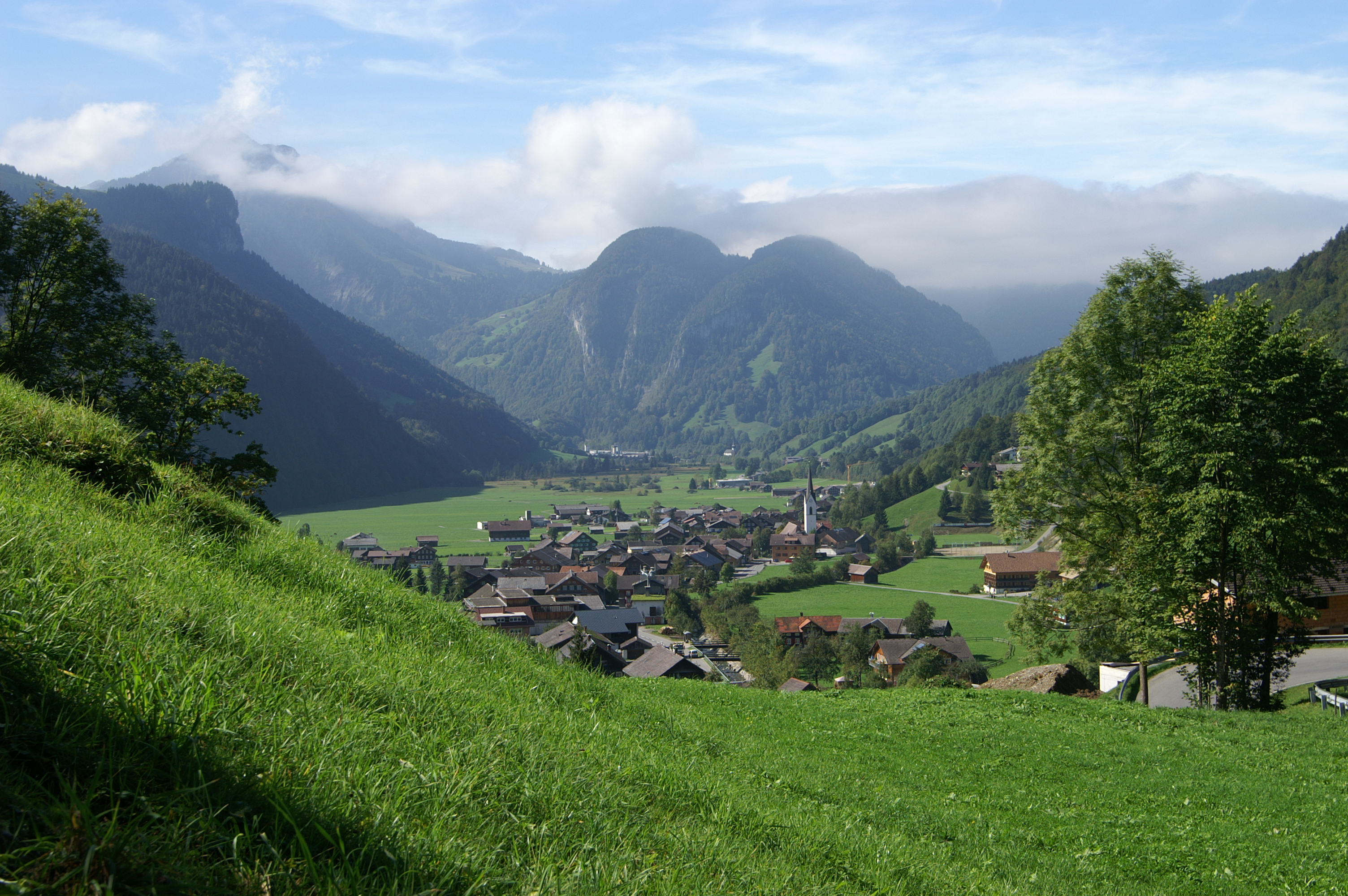

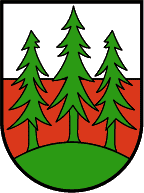
- Coat of arms

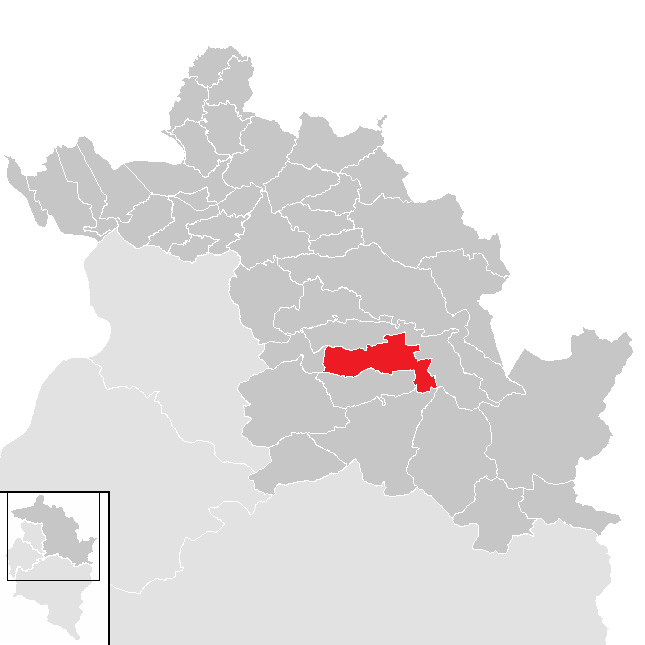
- Location in the district

- Location within Austria
- Coordinates: 47°22′08″N 09°55′24″E
- Country: Austria
- State: Vorarlberg
- District: Bregenz

Government
  - Mayor: Josef Moosbrugger (ÖVP)

Area
  - Total: 21.08 km^{2} (8.14 sq mi)
- Elevation: 681 m (2,234 ft)

Population (2018-01-01)
  - Total: 1,107
  - Density: 52.51/km^{2} (136.0/sq mi)
- Time zone: UTC+1 (CET)
  - Summer (DST): UTC+2 (CEST)
- Postal code: 6874
- Area code: 05514
- Vehicle registration: B
- Website: www.bizau.co.at

Bizau is a town in the Bregenz Forest in the Austrian state of Vorarlberg, part of the district Bregenz. The municipality has around 1080 inhabitants.

== Population ==
Historical population
Year	Pop.	±%
1869	663	—
1880	648	−2.3%
1890	615	−5.1%
1900	639	+3.9%
1910	702	+9.9%
1923	635	−9.5%
1934	707	+11.3%
1939	685	−3.1%
1951	793	+15.8%
1961	735	−7.3%
1971	749	+1.9%
1981	806	+7.6%
1991	851	+5.6%
2001	960	+12.8%
2011	1,022	+6.5%

== Cultural places of interest ==
The Parish Church Hl. Valentin was built in 1472.

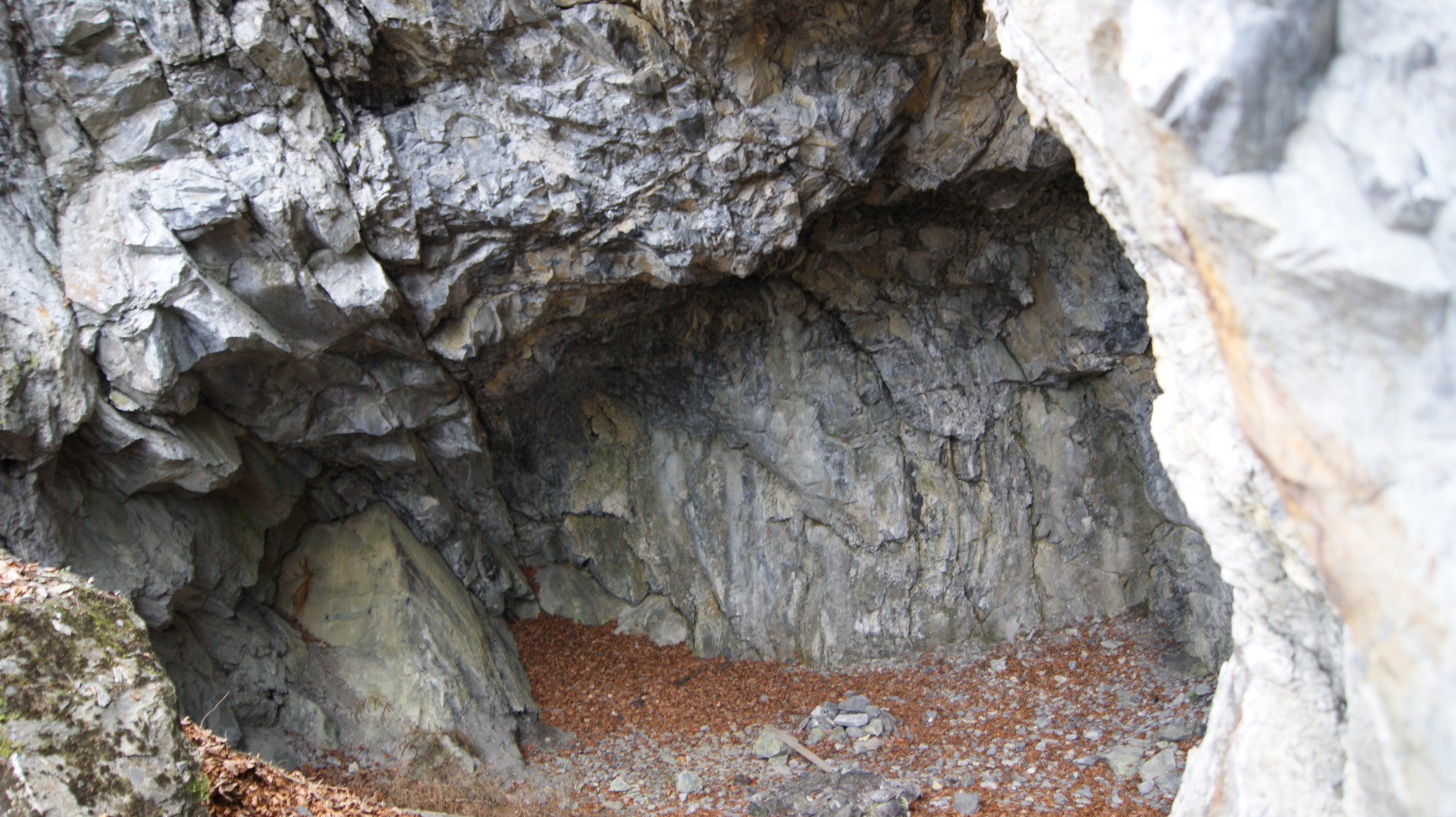
The Wetzsteinhöhle

The Wetzsteinhöhle ("Whetstone Cave") is a manmade dry cavity, a former mine for sandstone. The Hüttbach stream flows down below the cave.

In 2007, the municipality of Bizau declared a wooden fence ("Steackohag") a protected monument. The fence commemorates the traditional "Alpgasse", on which the cattle were transported to and from the mountain pastures (see Alpine Transhumance), while also symbolizing the handicraft traditions and the virtues of hard work for which the region is known.

Bizau is part of the Bregenzerwald Umgang (literally "Bregenzerwald Walking Tour"). This walking tour offers insights into the architecture and community planning of 12 traditional villages in the Bregenzerwald. While walking over various landscapes, visiting public buildings, homes and everyday objects, walkers gain a comprehensive overview of typical Bregenzerwald architectural styles as they developed throughout the ages.

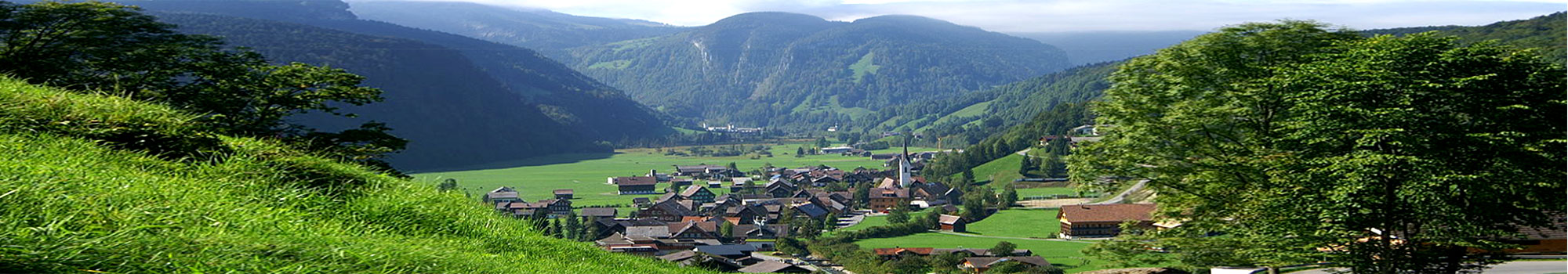
Panoramic view of Bizau
