= Kennelbach =

- Municipality
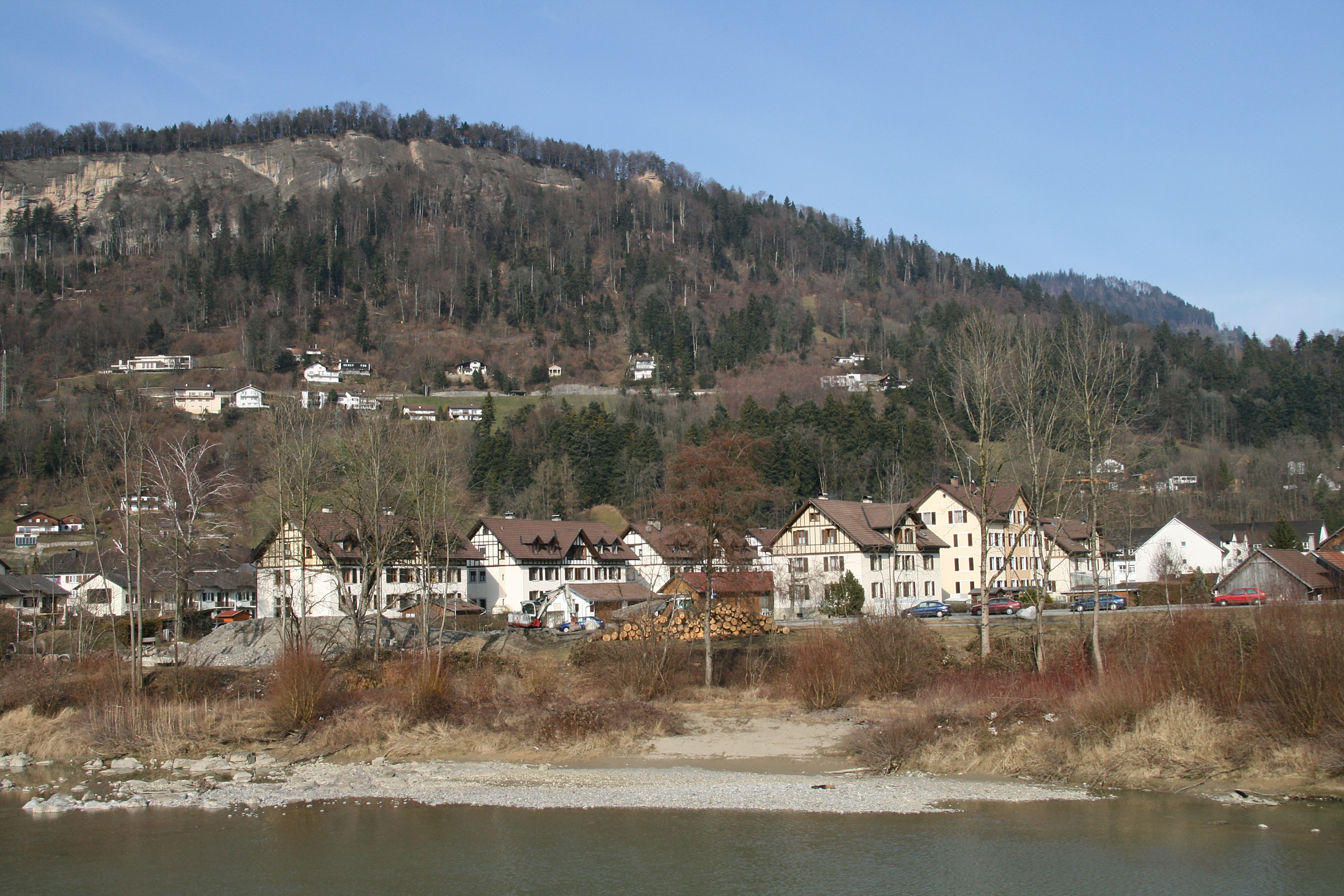

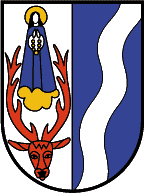
- Coat of arms

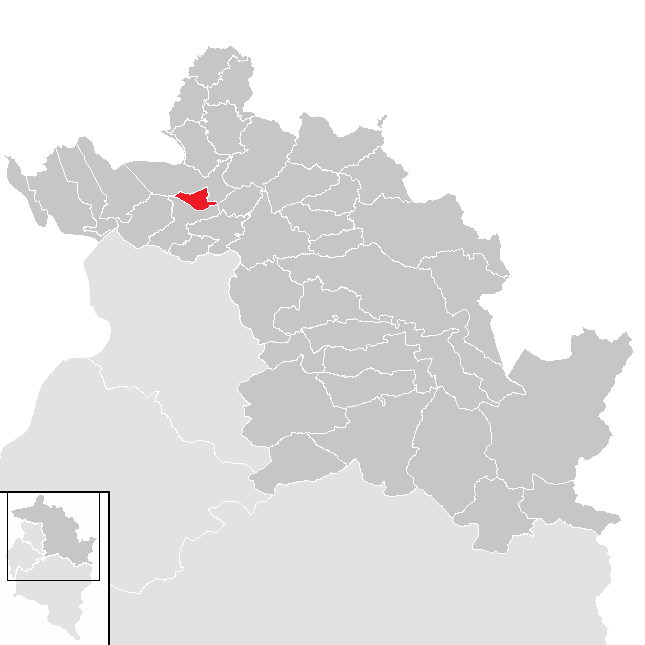
- Location in the district

- Location within Austria
- Coordinates: 47°28′59″N 09°46′00″E
- Country: Austria
- State: Vorarlberg
- District: Bregenz

Government
  - Mayor: Irmgard Hagspiel

Area
  - Total: 3.2 km^{2} (1.2 sq mi)
- Elevation: 430 m (1,410 ft)

Population (2018-01-01)
  - Total: 1,944
  - Density: 610/km^{2} (1,600/sq mi)
- Time zone: UTC+1 (CET)
  - Summer (DST): UTC+2 (CEST)
- Postal code: 6921
- Area code: 05574
- Vehicle registration: B
- Website: www.kennelbach.at

Kennelbach is a community in the district of Bregenz in the westernmost Austrian state of Vorarlberg.

As of 2016, it is the home of the operational headquarters of the sporting goods manufacturer Head, along with Amsterdam, the corporate headquarters.

== Geography ==
The town lies east of Lake Constance and is 430 meters above sea level. About 54 percent of its territory is forested.

== History ==
The Habsburg dynasty ruled Vorarlberg alternately from Tyrol and from Freiburg im Breisgau. From 1805 to 1814 Kennelbach belonged to Bavaria, and then again to Austria. It has been part of the Austrian state of Vorarlberg since its establishment in 1861. In the 19th century and first half of the 20th century it was economically influenced by the Schindler industrial family, whose cotton spinning factories closed in 1968. The former Schindler family home, Villa Grünau, has belonged to the town government since 1992 and functions as the town hall (Rathaus). From 1945 to 1955 the municipality was within the French occupation zone of Austria.

== Population ==
Historical population
Year	Pop.	±%
1869	563	—
1880	689	+22.4%
1890	877	+27.3%
1900	1,193	+36.0%
1910	1,446	+21.2%
1923	1,190	−17.7%
1934	1,274	+7.1%
1939	1,252	−1.7%
1951	1,505	+20.2%
1961	1,870	+24.3%
1971	2,129	+13.9%
1981	2,094	−1.6%
1991	2,128	+1.6%
2001	1,961	−7.8%
2011	1,886	−3.8%
2016	1,900	+0.7%

== Politics ==
Since 1 October 2008 the mayor has been Hans Bertsch, who took over from Reinhard Hagspiel. The town council consists of 18 members.

== Twin cities ==
- Scurelle, Italy

== Economy ==
Tourism is an important industry in Kennelbach.The well-known ski and tennis gear maker Head has its headquarters in Kennelbach.

== Personalities ==
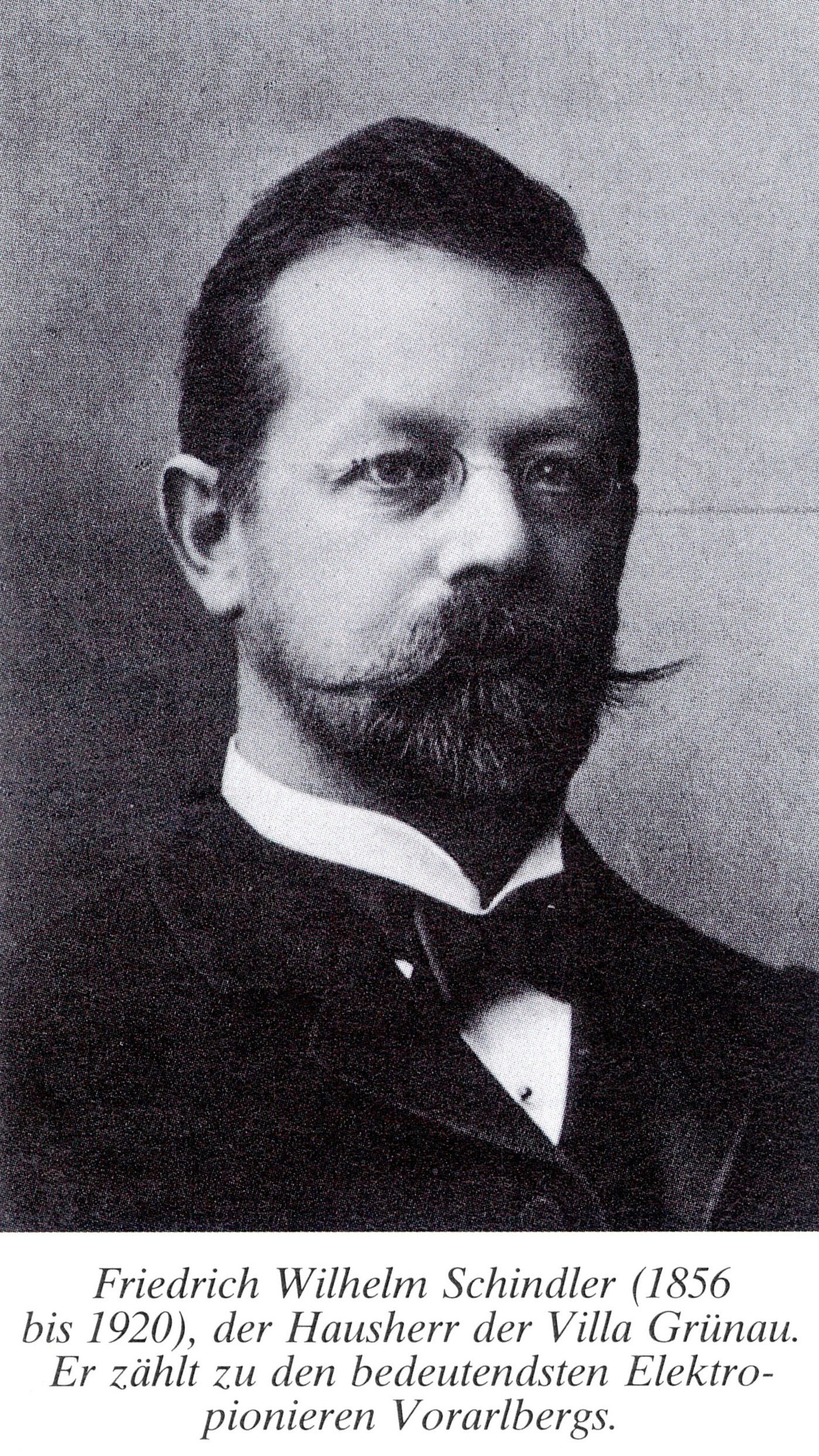
Friedrich Wilhelm Schindler

- Friedrich Wilhelm Schindler (1856-1920), Austrian entrepreneur and inventor.
- Hans Purin (1898-1989), Austrian painter and artist.
