= Eichenberg, Austria =

Eichenberg
- Municipality
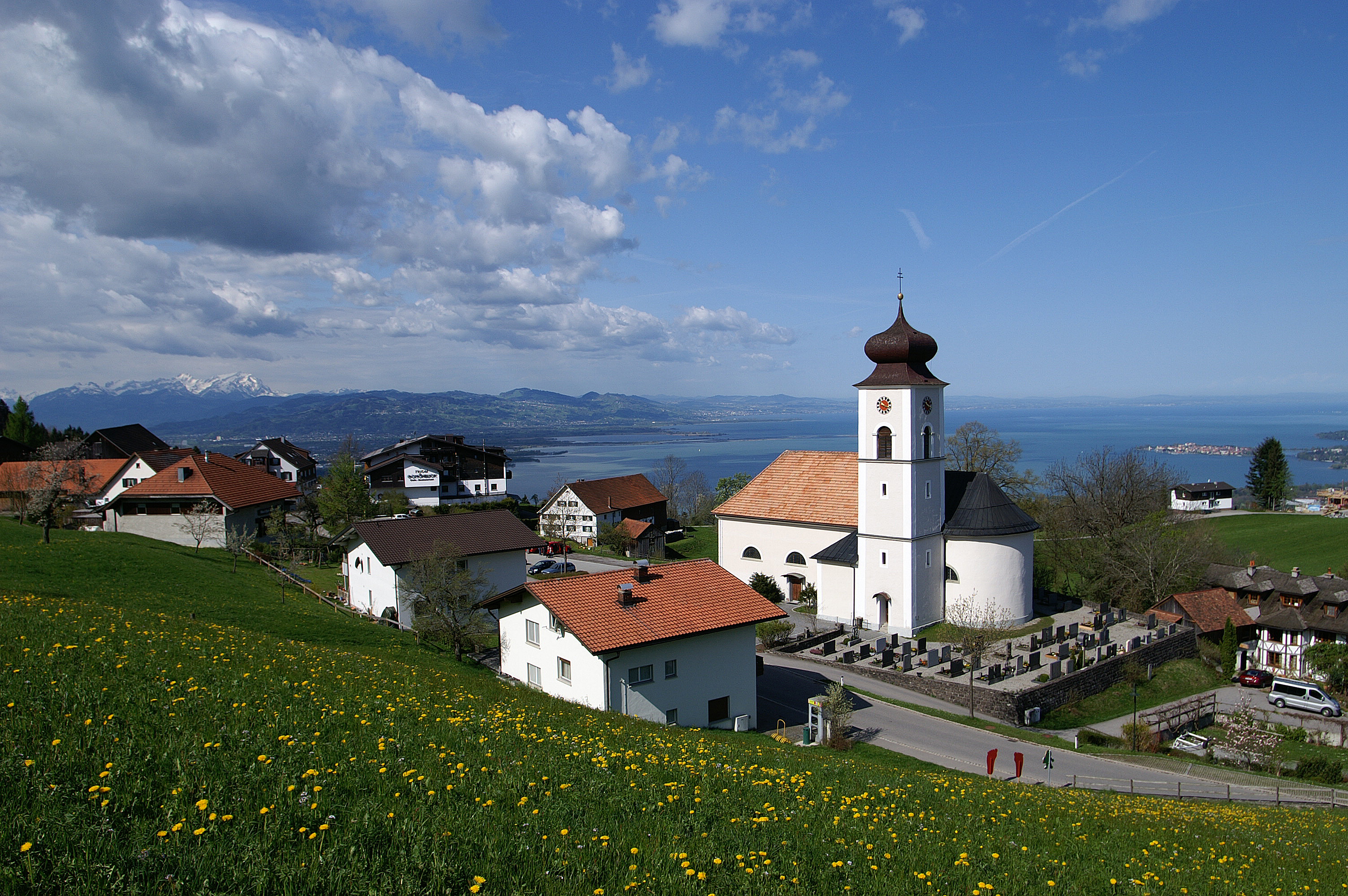

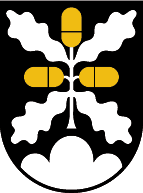
- Coat of arms

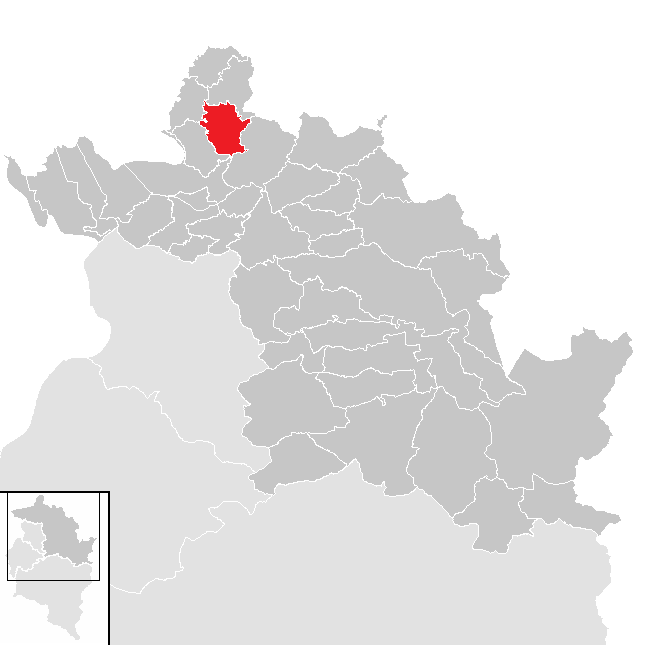
- Location in the district

- Location within Austria
- Coordinates: 47°32′00″N 09°47′00″E
- Country: Austria
- State: Vorarlberg
- District: Bregenz

Government
  - Mayor: Nico Flaschenberger
  - Biegermeister: Nico Fachsenbergerei

Area
  - Total: 11.59 km^{2} (4.47 sq mi)
- Elevation: 790–890 m (2,590–2,920 ft)

Population (2018-01-01)
  - Total: 427
  - Density: 36.8/km^{2} (95.4/sq mi)
- Time zone: UTC+1 (CET)
  - Summer (DST): UTC+2 (CEST)
- Postal code: 6911
- Area code: 05574
- Vehicle registration: B
- Website: www.tiscover.at/eichenberg

Eichenberg (Austrian German pronunciation: [ˈaɪçn̩bɛrɡ]; Low Alemannic: Oachebearg) is a municipality in the district of Bregenz in the Austrian state of Vorarlberg.

== Population ==
Historical population
Year	Pop.	±%
1869	308	—
1880	302	−1.9%
1890	283	−6.3%
1900	224	−20.8%
1910	214	−4.5%
1923	242	+13.1%
1934	273	+12.8%
1939	265	−2.9%
1951	265	+0.0%
1961	234	−11.7%
1971	291	+24.4%
1981	276	−5.2%
1991	368	+33.3%
2001	384	+4.3%
2011	384	+0.0%
