= Sulzberg, Austria =

Sulzberg
- Municipality
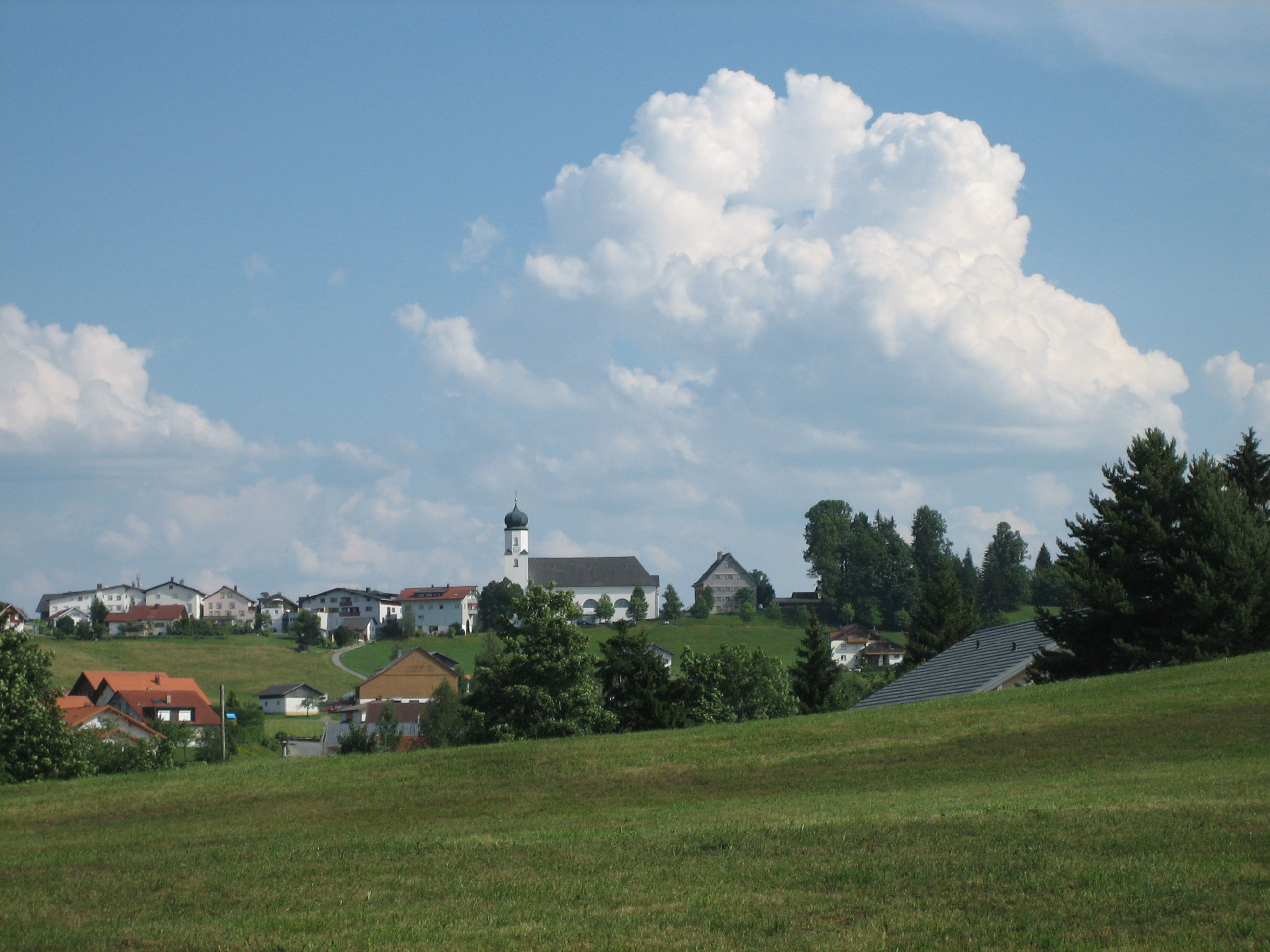

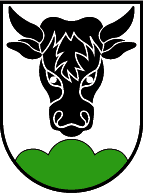
- Coat of arms

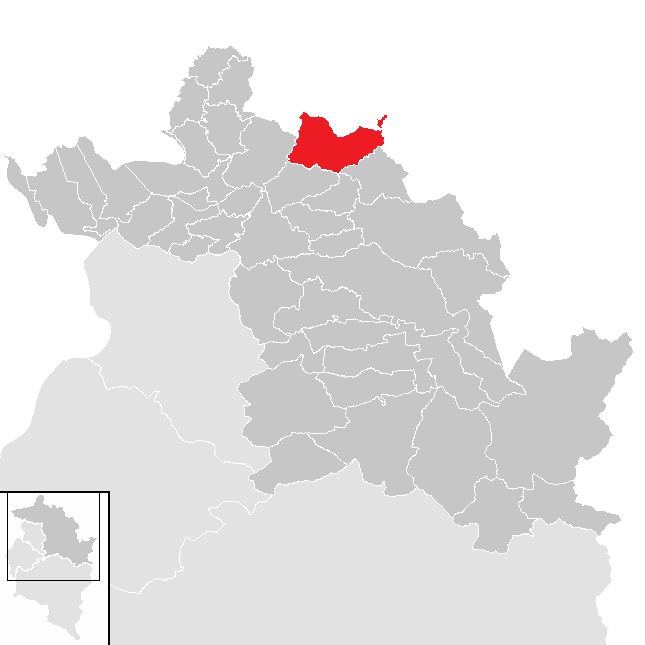
- Location in the district

- Location within Austria
- Coordinates: 47°31′00″N 09°54′00″E
- Country: Austria
- State: Vorarlberg
- District: Bregenz

Government
  - Mayor: Lukas Schrattenthaler

Area
  - Total: 23.05 km^{2} (8.90 sq mi)
- Elevation: 1,015 m (3,330 ft)

Population (2018-01-01)
  - Total: 1,818
  - Density: 78.87/km^{2} (204.3/sq mi)
- Time zone: UTC+1 (CET)
  - Summer (DST): UTC+2 (CEST)
- Postal code: 6934
- Area code: 05516
- Vehicle registration: B
- Website: www.sulzberg.at

Sulzberg (Austrian German pronunciation: [ˈsʊltsbɛrɡ]) is a municipality in the district of Bregenz, in the westernmost Austrian state of Vorarlberg.

It is a member of the German-Austrian community project Naturpark Nagelfluhkette.

== Toponymy ==
The place name "Sulzeberg" was first mentioned in documents in 1249. Around 1400, "Smaltzhuben uff the Sultzberg" were mentioned as inhabitants, who had to deliver lard and cheese to the Count of Bregenz.

== Culture ==
- Following to the plans of Alois Negrelli, the parish church hl. Laurentius was enlarged in state empire style from 1828 to 1829, with the use of older parts. In the years 1988 to 1991, the church was renovated.
- Chapel of St. Leonhard: Of the altogether 13 chapels of Sulzberg, the chapel St. Leonhard, from the year 1497, is worth mentioning. It is not far from today's Sulzberg parish church on the road to Doren. The church originally belonged to the monastery in Kempten (Allgäu). During the Thirty Years' War, in 1647, the Swedes used the chapel as a stable for horses. The unique frescoes of the chapel and the altars and wooden ceilings from the early Baroque period have been preserved. The chapel has long been a popular place of pilgrimage. From 1980 until completion of renovation in 2006, it was unusable. Since November 2006 the chapel St. Leonhard shines in new splendor.
- Parish church Sulzberg-Thal.
- Marienlinde: The more than 400 year old lime tree. In its trunk, the trees contains a statue of Mary, with the inscription: "Maria vom Sieg, beende den Krieg und schütze uns mit deinem Kinde aus der Marienlinde.“ (Mary of victory, end the war and protect us with your child from the Marienlinde).

== Coat of arms ==
The coat of arms of the municipality Sulzberg shows a frontal view of a black ox head above a three-peaked green mountain. Presumably, the coat of arms was designed by church archivist Andreas Ulmer and is symbolic of the significance of agriculture for the community of Sulzberg.

== Population ==
Historical population
Year	Pop.	±%
1869	1,489	—
1880	1,423	−4.4%
1890	1,439	+1.1%
1900	1,425	−1.0%
1910	1,443	+1.3%
1923	1,401	−2.9%
1934	1,487	+6.1%
1939	1,344	−9.6%
1951	1,579	+17.5%
1961	1,474	−6.6%
1971	1,574	+6.8%
1981	1,507	−4.3%
1991	1,577	+4.6%
2001	1,722	+9.2%
2011	1,750	+1.6%
