= Möggers =

- Municipality
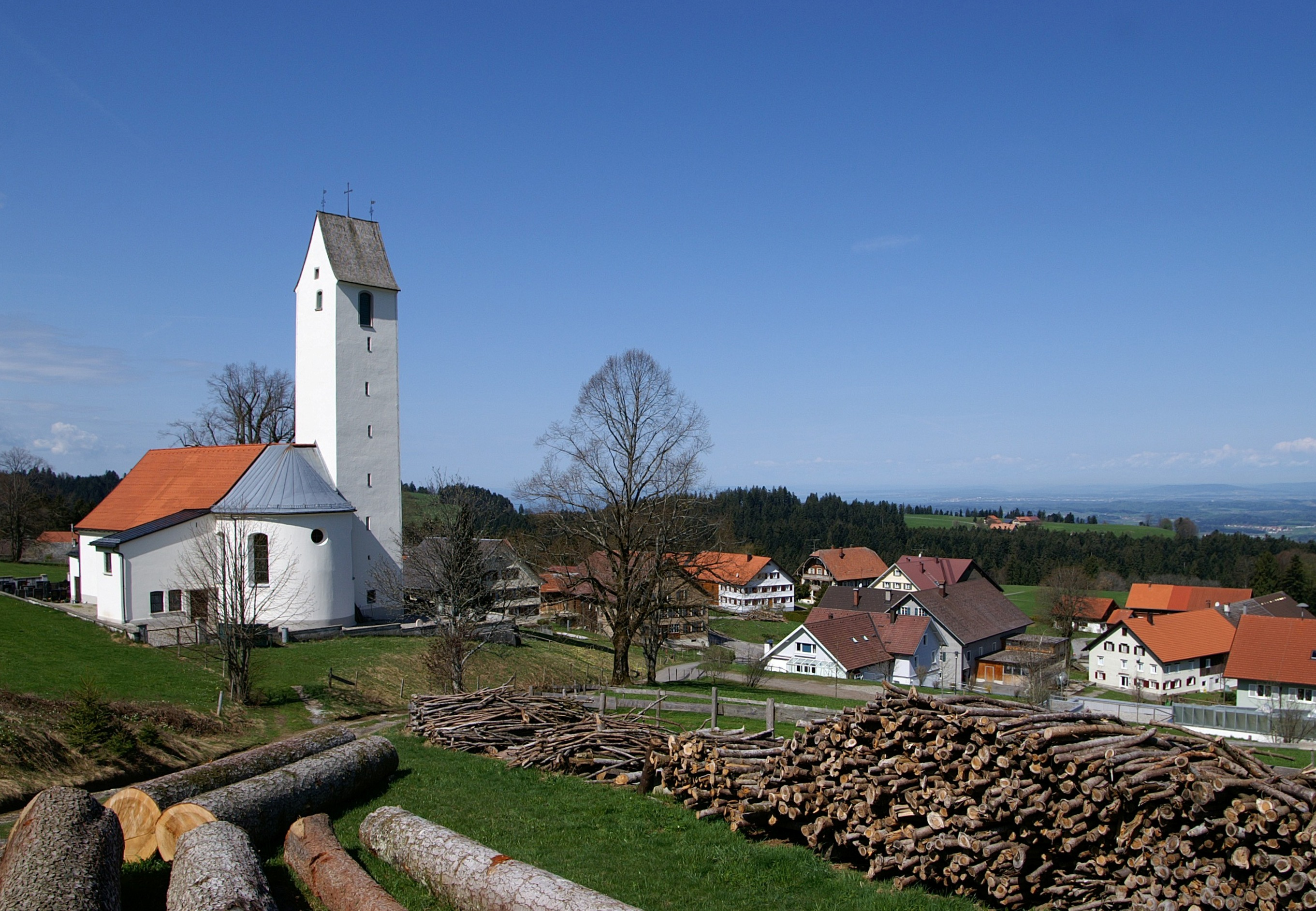

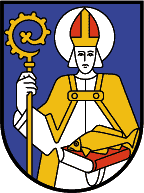
- Coat of arms

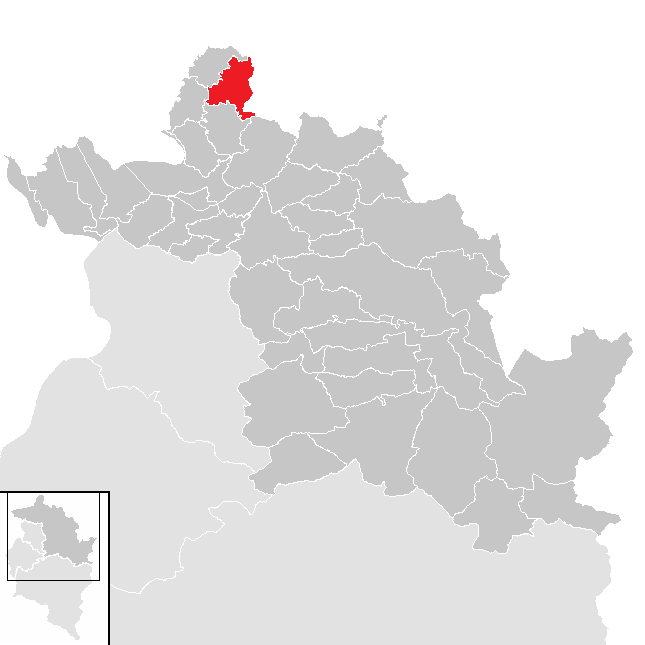
- Location in the district

- Location within Austria
- Coordinates: 47°34′00″N 09°49′00″E
- Country: Austria
- State: Vorarlberg
- District: Bregenz

Government
  - Mayor: Georg Bantel

Area
  - Total: 11.45 km^{2} (4.42 sq mi)
- Elevation: 948 m (3,110 ft)

Population (2018-01-01)
  - Total: 534
  - Density: 46.6/km^{2} (121/sq mi)
- Time zone: UTC+1 (CET)
  - Summer (DST): UTC+2 (CEST)
- Postal code: 6900
- Area code: 05573
- Vehicle registration: B
- Website: www.riskommunal.at/ moeggers

Möggers is a municipality in the district of Bregenz in the Austrian state of Vorarlberg.

== Population ==
Historical population
Year	Pop.	±%
1869	413	—
1880	406	−1.7%
1890	433	+6.7%
1900	438	+1.2%
1910	417	−4.8%
1923	411	−1.4%
1934	461	+12.2%
1939	388	−15.8%
1951	405	+4.4%
1961	429	+5.9%
1971	422	−1.6%
1981	394	−6.6%
1991	548	+39.1%
2001	561	+2.4%
2011	536	−4.5%
