= Alberschwende =

Municipality in Vorarlberg, Austria

- Municipality
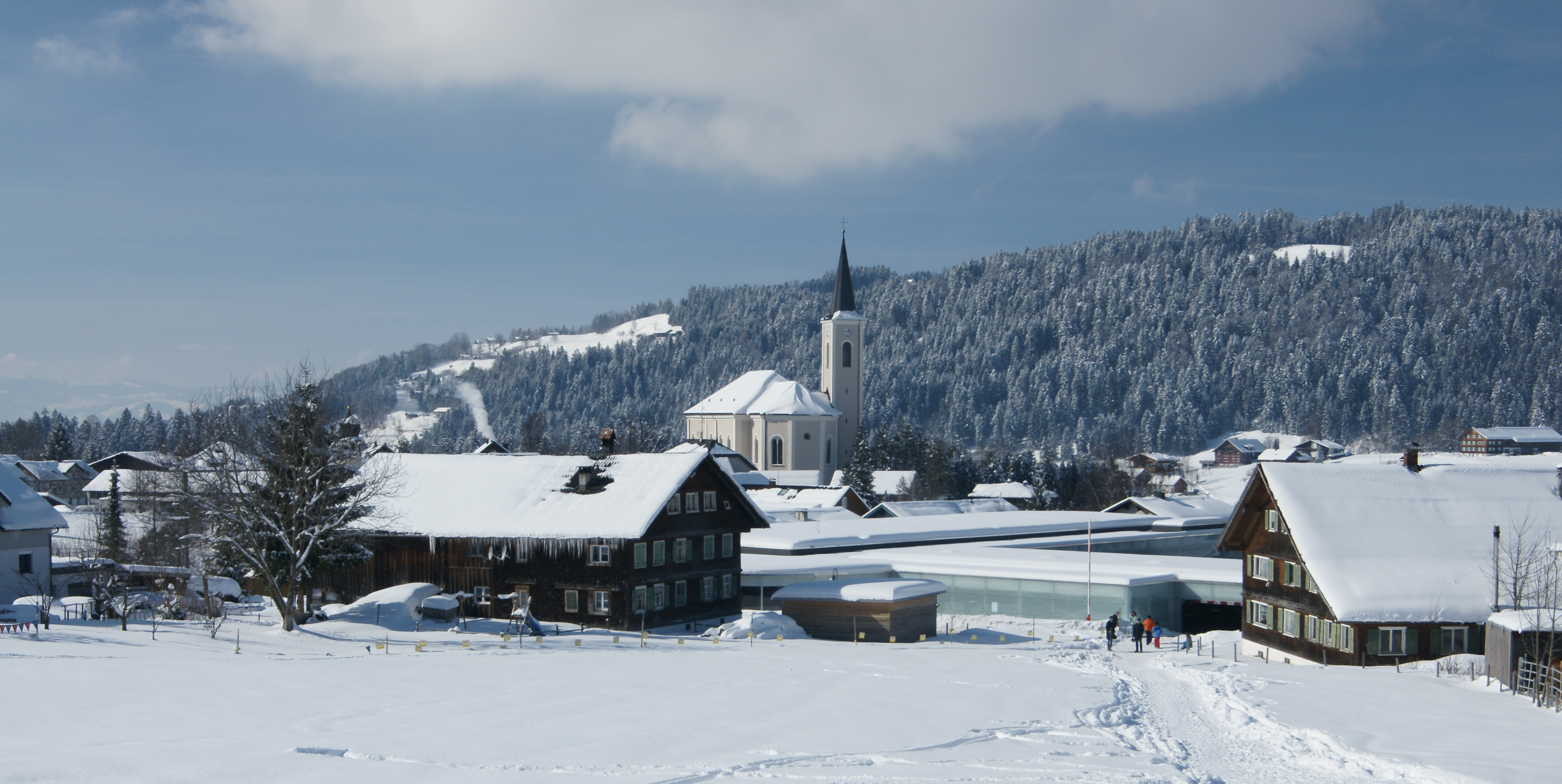
- Alberschwende in winter

- Coat of arms

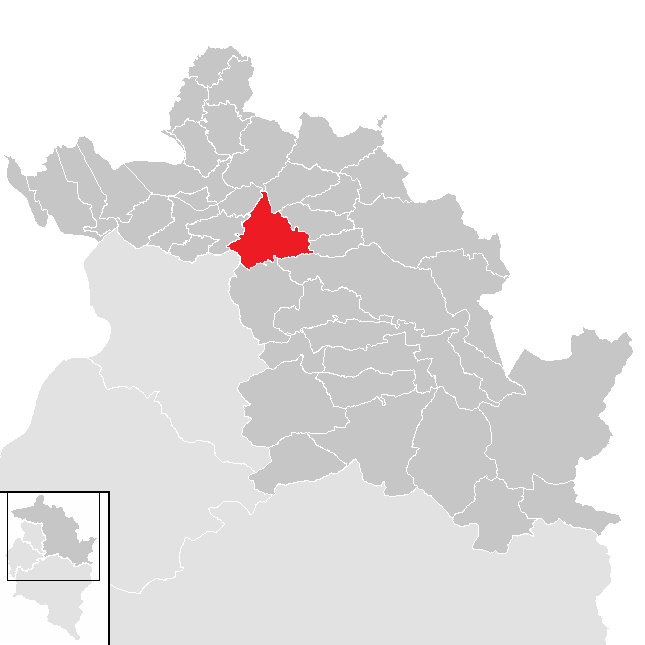
- Location in the district

- Location within Austria
- Coordinates: 47°27′00″N 09°49′00″E
- Country: Austria
- State: Vorarlberg
- District: Bregenz

Government
  - Mayor: Klaus Sohm

Area
  - Total: 21.15 km^{2} (8.17 sq mi)
- Elevation: 721 m (2,365 ft)

Population (2018-01-01)
  - Total: 3,247
  - Density: 153.5/km^{2} (397.6/sq mi)
- Time zone: UTC+1 (CET)
  - Summer (DST): UTC+2 (CEST)
- Postal code: 6861
- Area code: 05579
- Vehicle registration: B
- Website: www.alberschwende.at

Alberschwende is a municipality in Bregenz District in the Austrian state of Vorarlberg. It lies in the Bregenzerwald, south of Lake Constance and northeast of Dornbirn, at the foot of the Brüggelekopf. On 1 January 2025 it had 3,338 inhabitants.

The place was first documented in 1227 as Albrichsswendi. The modern municipality grew out of medieval clearings and farm holdings, and by about 1600 Alberschwende had become its own court district. Like the rest of Vorarlberg, it belonged to Bavaria from 1805 to 1814 before returning to Austria.

== Geography ==
Alberschwende covers 21.15 square kilometres and forms part of the western Bregenzerwald. The municipality's highest point is the Brüggelekopf, at 1,182 metres above sea level. The Austrian Academy of Sciences' historical lexicon records numerous hamlets and farmsteads in the municipal area, reflecting its dispersed settlement pattern.

== History ==
According to the municipal history published by Alberschwende, the surrounding area was administered by the Counts of Bregenz in the 11th century, and a church was established in the village in that period. The village is first mentioned in records in 1227. The Austrian Academy of Sciences traces the present municipality to ten original farm holdings, parts of two others, and the estate of Dreßlen.

From about 1600, Alberschwende was the seat of its own local court. During the Napoleonic Wars, Vorarlberg was ceded to Bavaria, and Alberschwende remained Bavarian until 1814.

== Population ==
Long-term population figures show growth from 1,847 inhabitants in 1869 to 3,338 in 2025, although the municipality experienced a decline in the early 20th century before resuming growth after the Second World War.

Historical population
| Year | Pop. | ±% |
|---|---|---|
| 1869 | 1,847 | — |
| 1880 | 1,766 | −4.4% |
| 1890 | 1,806 | +2.3% |
| 1900 | 1,922 | +6.4% |
| 1910 | 1,714 | −10.8% |
| 1923 | 1,699 | −0.9% |
| 1934 | 1,767 | +4.0% |
| 1939 | 1,889 | +6.9% |
| 1951 | 1,900 | +0.6% |
| 1961 | 2,073 | +9.1% |
| 1971 | 2,276 | +9.8% |
| 1981 | 2,504 | +10.0% |
| 1991 | 2,818 | +12.5% |
| 2001 | 3,019 | +7.1% |
| 2011 | 3,109 | +3.0% |
| 2021 | 3,208 | +3.2% |
| 2025 | 3,338 | +4.1% |

== Politics ==
Since 2025, the mayor of Alberschwende has been Klaus Sohm. In the 2025 municipal council election, Liste Alberschwende won 20 of the 24 council seats and Alberschwende Aktiv won four.

== Landmarks ==
The parish church of St. Martin stands in the village centre. A church is recorded on the site from the early 12th century; the present church was built between 1854 and 1856 and dedicated to St. Martin. Its high altar was reconstructed in 1999-2003 during a major renovation. Other local sights highlighted by the municipality include the Dorflinde, listed as a natural monument, and the Brüggelekopf, a local mountain and lookout point over the Bregenzerwald and the Lake Constance region.

== Notable people ==
- Hermann Gmeiner (1919-1986), founder of SOS Children's Villages, was born in the hamlet of Tannen in Alberschwende.
