= Hohenweiler =

Hohenweiler Howiilar
- Municipality
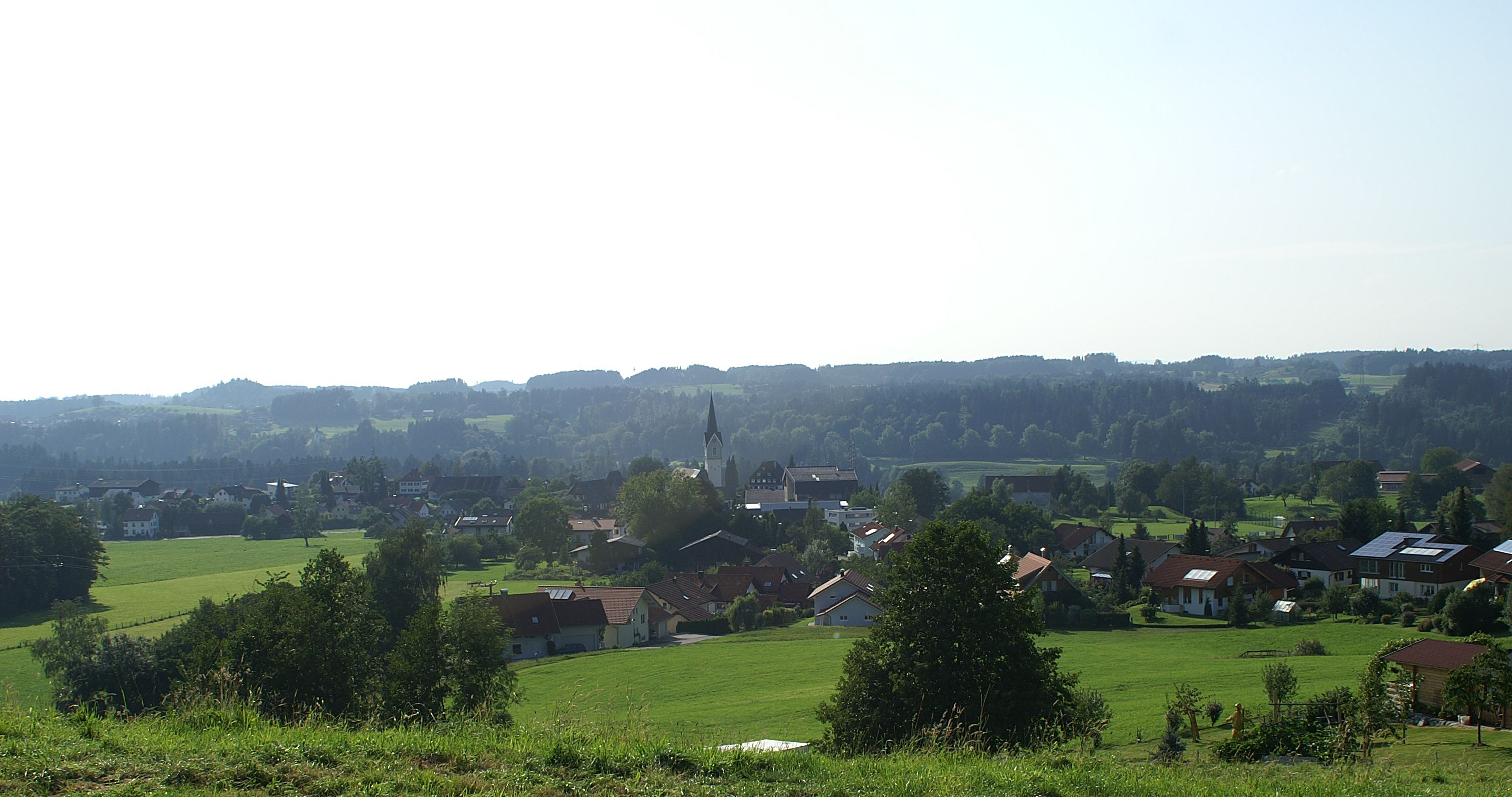

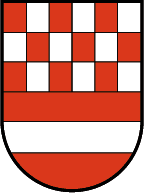
- Coat of arms

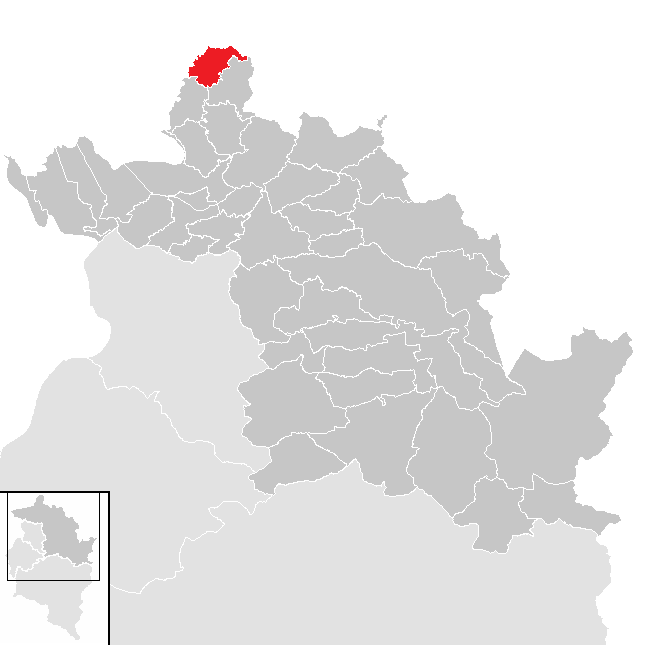
- Location in the district

- Location within Austria
- Coordinates: 47°35′00″N 09°47′00″E
- Country: Austria
- State: Vorarlberg
- District: Bregenz

Government
  - Mayor: Wolfgang Langes

Area
  - Total: 8.45 km^{2} (3.26 sq mi)
- Elevation: 503 m (1,650 ft)

Population (2018-01-01)
  - Total: 1,271
  - Density: 150/km^{2} (390/sq mi)
- Time zone: UTC+1 (CET)
  - Summer (DST): UTC+2 (CEST)
- Postal code: 6914
- Area code: 05573
- Vehicle registration: B
- Website: www.hohenweiler.at

Hohenweiler (Low Alemannic: Howiilar) is a municipality in the district of Bregenz in the Austrian state of Vorarlberg.

== Population ==
Historical population
Year	Pop.	±%
1869	477	—
1880	453	−5.0%
1890	463	+2.2%
1900	531	+14.7%
1910	528	−0.6%
1923	529	+0.2%
1934	604	+14.2%
1939	585	−3.1%
1951	647	+10.6%
1961	630	−2.6%
1971	784	+24.4%
1981	951	+21.3%
1991	1,122	+18.0%
2001	1,247	+11.1%
2011	1,283	+2.9%
