= Hörbranz =

- Municipality
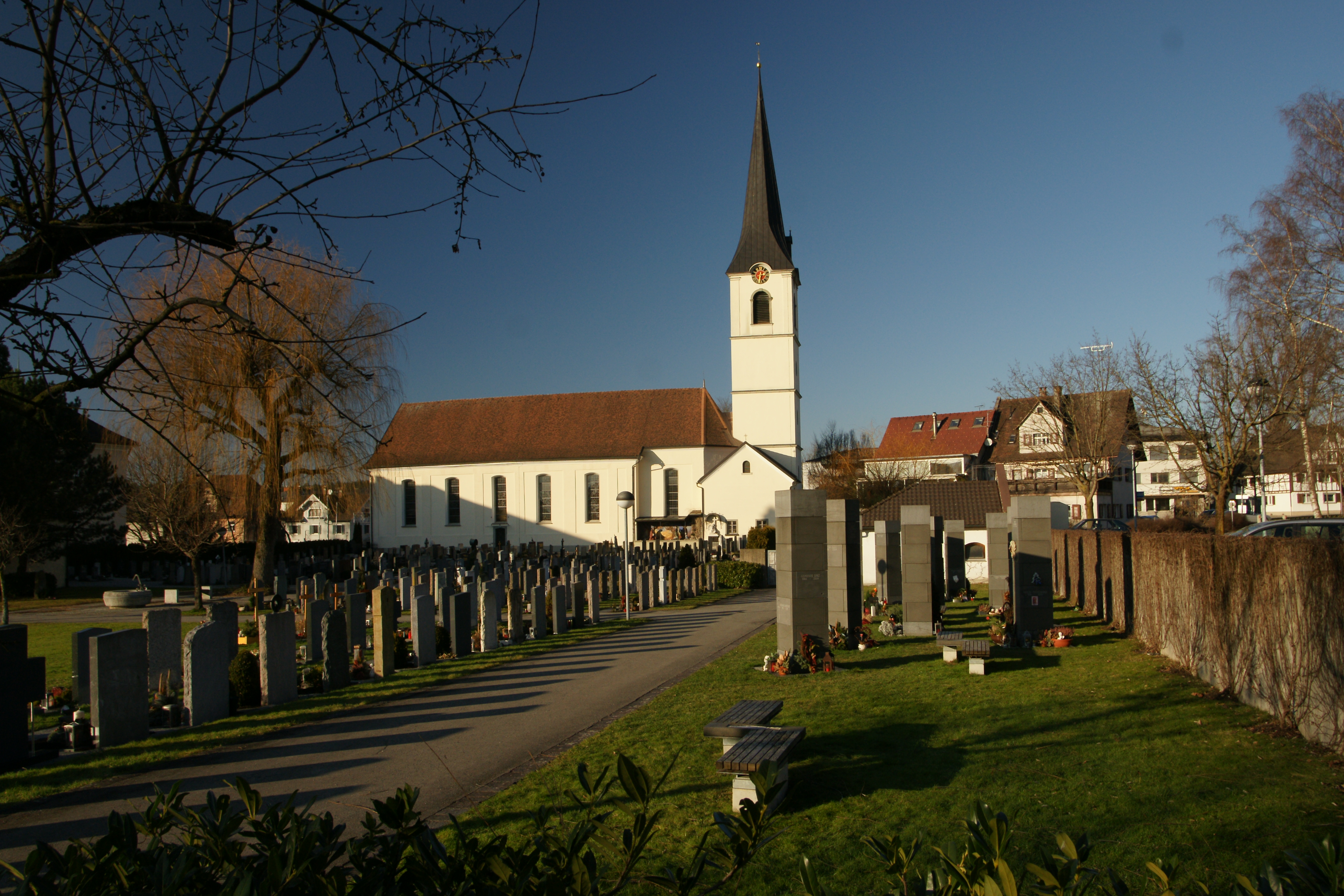

- Coat of arms

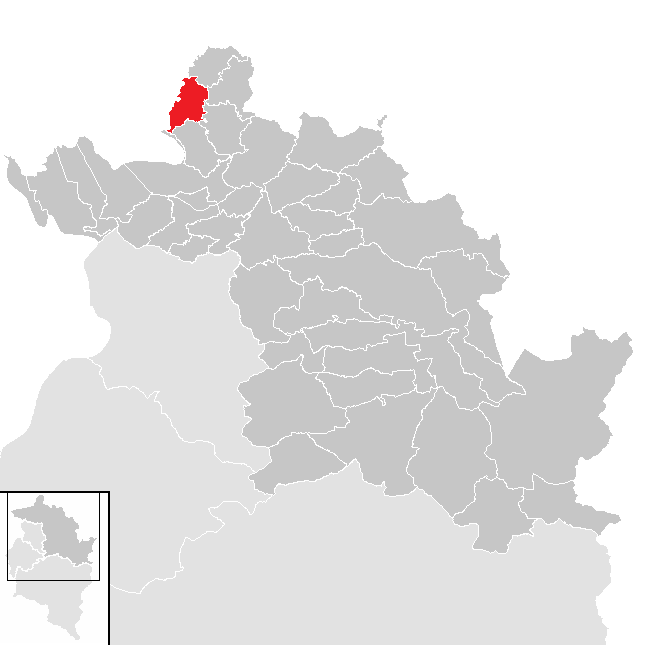
- Location in the district

- Location within Austria
- Coordinates: 47°33′00″N 09°45′00″E
- Country: Austria
- State: Vorarlberg
- District: Bregenz

Government
  - Mayor: Karl Hehle (ÖVP)

Area
  - Total: 8.74 km^{2} (3.37 sq mi)
- Elevation: 426 m (1,398 ft)

Population (2018-01-01)
  - Total: 6,346
  - Density: 726/km^{2} (1,880/sq mi)
- Time zone: UTC+1 (CET)
  - Summer (DST): UTC+2 (CEST)
- Postal code: 6912
- Area code: 05573
- Vehicle registration: B
- Website: www.hoerbranz.at

Hörbranz is a municipality in the district of Bregenz in the Austrian state of Vorarlberg.

== Population ==
Historical population
Year	Pop.	±%
1869	1,174	—
1880	1,190	+1.4%
1890	1,317	+10.7%
1900	1,456	+10.6%
1910	1,672	+14.8%
1923	1,816	+8.6%
1934	2,017	+11.1%
1939	1,959	−2.9%
1951	2,523	+28.8%
1961	3,260	+29.2%
1971	4,541	+39.3%
1981	4,997	+10.0%
1991	5,566	+11.4%
2001	6,153	+10.5%
2011	6,288	+2.2%

== Transport ==
Lochau-Hörbranz railway station serves Lochau and Hörbranz. It is located on Vorarlberg's main line, which runs in north-south direction. The station is served by the S1 regional train service of Vorarlberg S-Bahn and a regional express train (REX 1), both operated by Austrian Federal Railways (ÖBB).
