= Lochau =

- Municipality
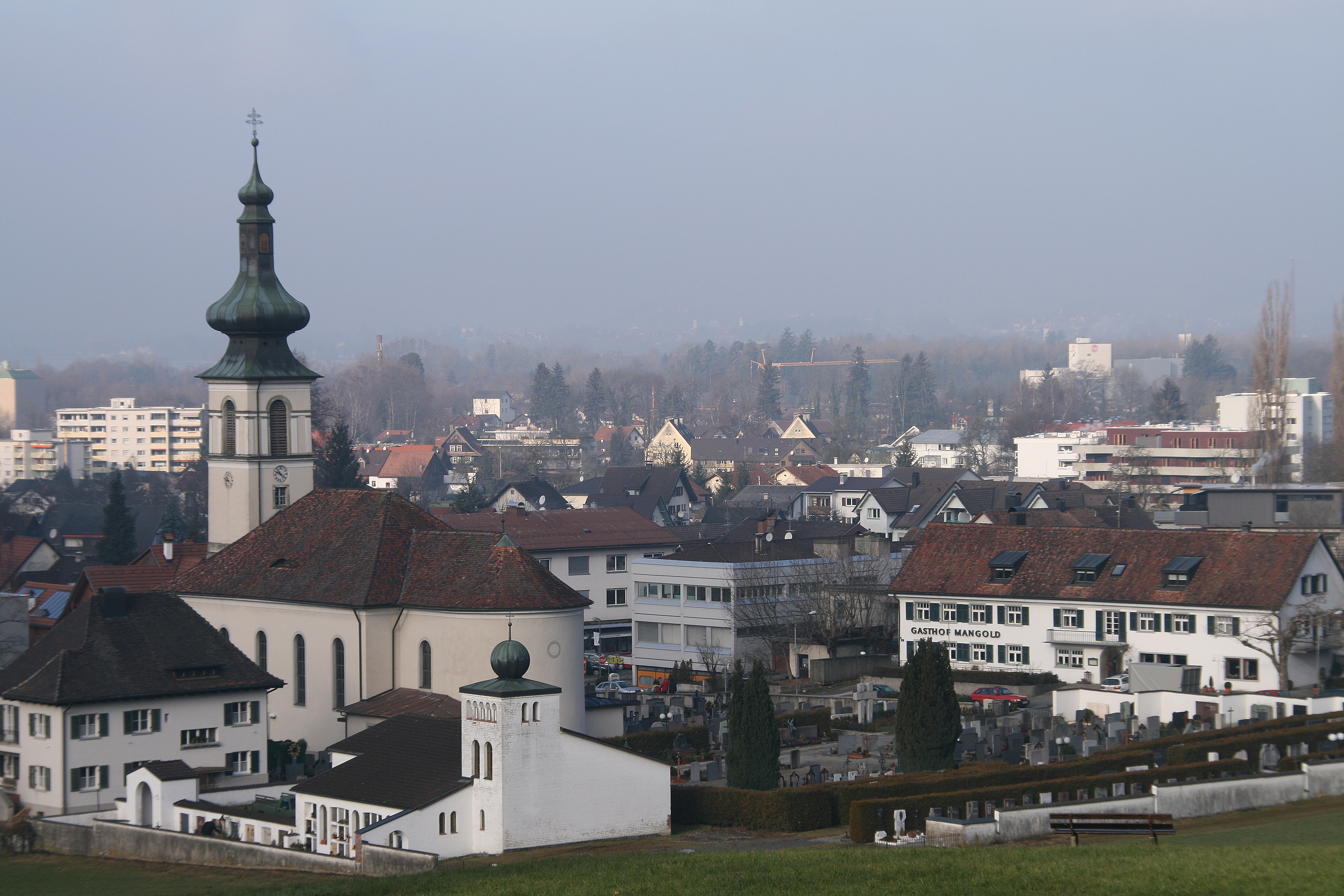

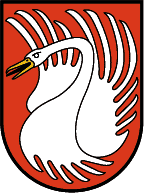
- Coat of arms

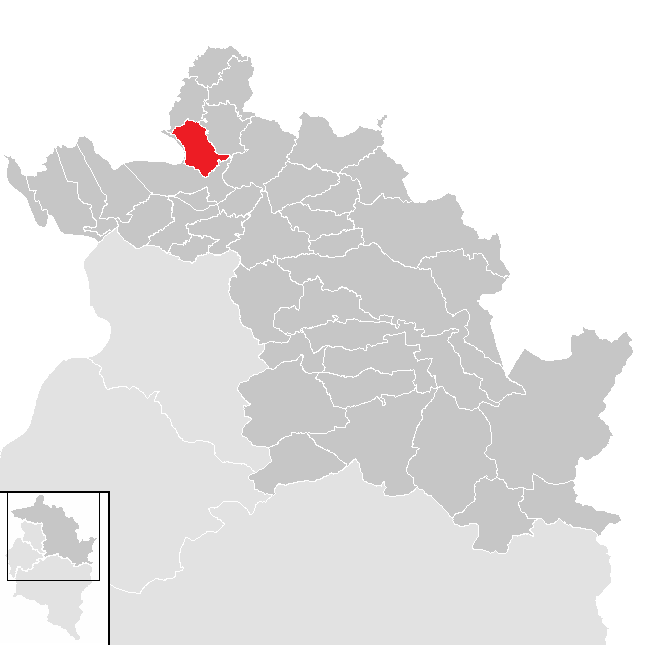
- Location in the district

- Location within Austria
- Coordinates: 47°31′00″N 09°45′00″E
- Country: Austria
- State: Vorarlberg
- District: Bregenz

Government
  - Mayor: Michael Simma

Area
  - Municipality: 10.27 km^{2} (3.97 sq mi)
- Elevation: 416 m (1,365 ft)

Population (2018-01-01)
  - Municipality: 5,747
  - Density: 559.6/km^{2} (1,449/sq mi)
  - Urban: 200,000
- Time zone: UTC+1 (CET)
  - Summer (DST): UTC+2 (CEST)
- Postal code: 6911
- Area code: 05574
- Vehicle registration: B
- Website: www.lochau.at

Lochau is a municipality in the westernmost Austrian state of Vorarlberg. It is located on Lake Constance, in the Bregenz district, near the border to Germany.

About 50.3% of the municipality's area is forest. The Pfänder, the landmark mountain of the neighboring municipality of Bregenz, also lies within Lochau's boundaries. In the west, the Leiblach river forms the border to the German county (Landkreis) of Lindau.

== History ==
The Habsburgs ruled over their Vorarlberg lands alternately from Tyrol and Further Austria. From 1805 to 1814 Lochau belonged to Bavaria, then reverted to Austria. In 1861 it became part of the Austrian Federal State of Vorarlberg. During World War II, a subcamp of Dachau concentration camp was located there. Between 1945 and 1955 the municipality was part of the French occupation zone in Austria.

== Population ==
Historical population
| Year | Pop. | ±% |
|---|---|---|
| 1869 | 972 | — |
| 1880 | 925 | −4.8% |
| 1890 | 1,259 | +36.1% |
| 1900 | 1,362 | +8.2% |
| 1910 | 1,526 | +12.0% |
| 1923 | 1,455 | −4.7% |
| 1934 | 1,727 | +18.7% |
| 1939 | 1,717 | −0.6% |
| 1951 | 3,030 | +76.5% |
| 1961 | 3,745 | +23.6% |
| 1971 | 4,638 | +23.8% |
| 1981 | 5,239 | +13.0% |
| 1991 | 5,472 | +4.4% |
| 2001 | 5,242 | −4.2% |
| 2011 | 5,434 | +3.7% |

== Transport ==
Lochau-Hörbranz railway station serves Lochau and Hörbranz. It is located on Vorarlberg's main line, which runs in north-south direction. The station is served by the S1 regional train service of Vorarlberg S-Bahn and a regional express train (REX 1), both operated by Austrian Federal Railways (ÖBB).
