= Langen bei Bregenz =

- Municipality
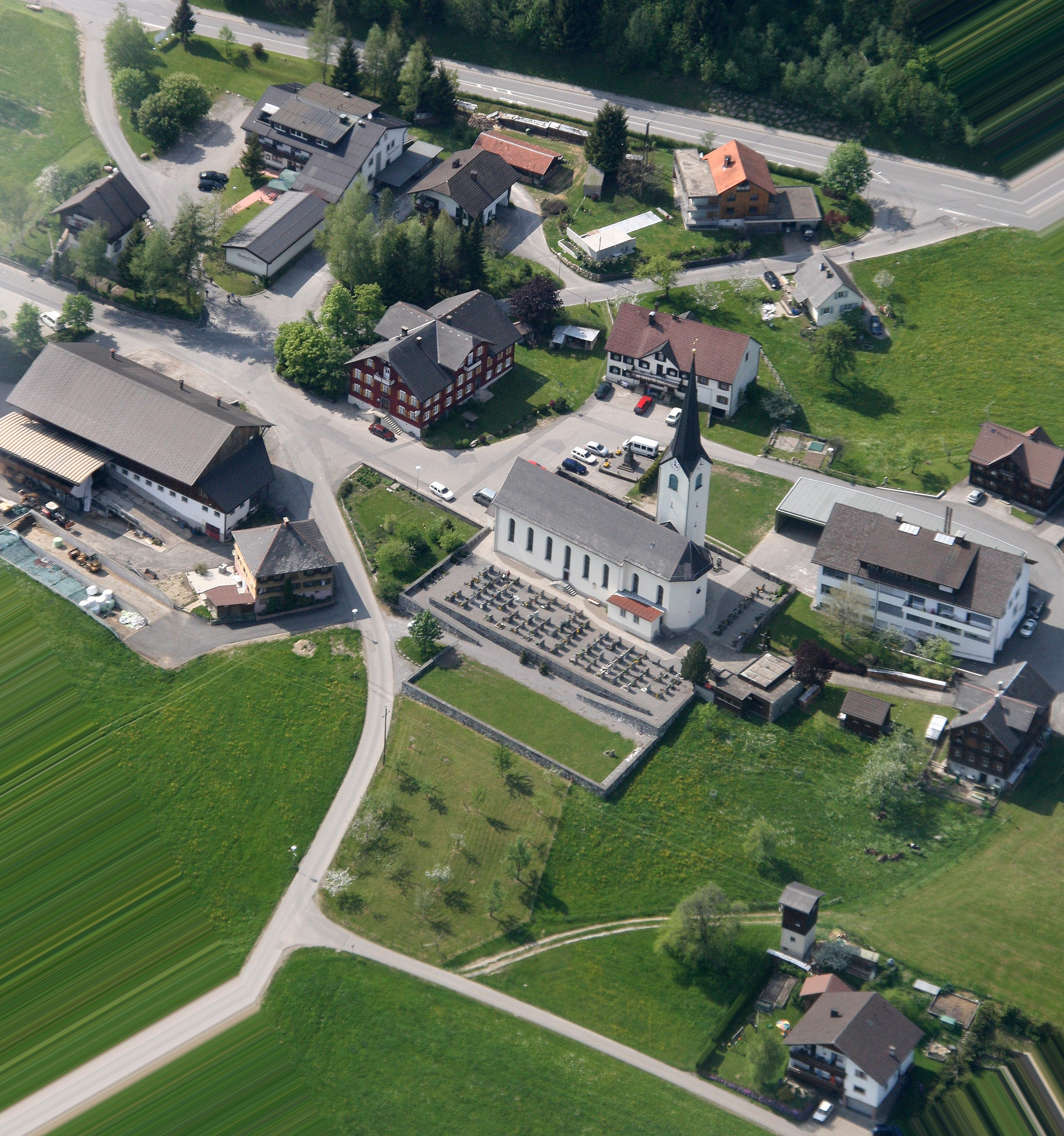

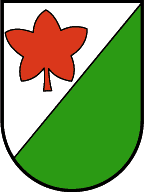
- Coat of arms

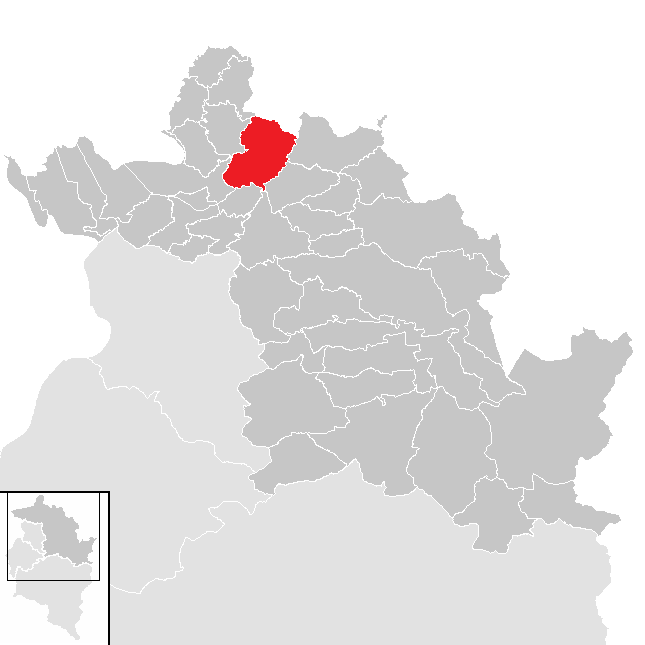
- Location in the district

- Location within Austria
- Coordinates: 47°30′28″N 09°49′37″E
- Country: Austria
- State: Vorarlberg
- District: Bregenz

Government
  - Mayor: Josef Kirchmann

Area
  - Total: 21.88 km^{2} (8.45 sq mi)
- Elevation: 658 m (2,159 ft)

Population (2018-01-01)
  - Total: 1,405
  - Density: 64.21/km^{2} (166.3/sq mi)
- Time zone: UTC+1 (CET)
  - Summer (DST): UTC+2 (CEST)
- Postal code: 6932
- Area code: 05575
- Vehicle registration: B
- Website: www.langen.at

Langen bei Bregenz is a municipality in the district of Bregenz in the Austrian state of Vorarlberg.

== Population ==
Historical population
Year	Pop.	±%
1869	727	—
1880	784	+7.8%
1890	649	−17.2%
1900	814	+25.4%
1910	679	−16.6%
1923	652	−4.0%
1934	651	−0.2%
1939	643	−1.2%
1951	712	+10.7%
1961	755	+6.0%
1971	845	+11.9%
1981	1,019	+20.6%
1991	1,194	+17.2%
2001	1,299	+8.8%
2011	1,305	+0.5%
