= Wenatchee High School =

Location
- 1101 Millerdale Avenue; Wenatchee, WA 98801; Wenatchee, Washington 98801; United States; 47°24′36″N 120°19′37″W

Information
- Type: Public School
- Established: 1885
- School district: Wenatchee School District #246
- Superintendent: Kory Kalahar
- Principal: Donna Moser
- Teaching staff: 102.40 (on an FTE basis)
- Grades: 9–12
- Enrollment: 2,082 (2024–2025)
- Student to teacher ratio: 19.79
- Hours in school day: Monday (late start): 10:10 am to 3:25 pm Tuesday to Friday: 8:40 am to 3:25 pm
- Colors: Purple and gold
- Athletics conference: Big 9 4A
- Mascot: The Panther
- Nickname: Panthers
- Rivals: Moses Lake High School Eastmont High School
- Newspaper: The Apple Leaf
- Yearbook: WaWa
- Website: whs.wenatcheeschools.org

Wenatchee High School is a public school in Wenatchee, Washington, United States. It serves grades 9–12 for the Wenatchee School District.

== History ==
Wenatchee High School was first established in 1885. The first school was built around 1903 in Wenatchee and was first named as the Whitman School after the names of two people, Dr and Mrs Marcus Whitman.

In 1909-1911s, the high school was bought and built around in Idaho and King Streets. Classrooms were added to the schools along the way and later portables were added.

In 1971, Wenatchee High School was being built around Miller and Millerdale streets, and the high school was still undergoing renovations between 1984 and 2005; portables were being added after the renovations from 2006 to 2013.

== Demographics ==
According to Wenatchee School District, the students' demographics data report show that 53% of the students are identified as Latino, 43% of the students are identified as White, 1% of the students are identified as Asian, and 3% of the students are identified from other or multiple racial backgrounds from all the students attending to WSD in Washington.

=== 2024–2025 demographic report card ===
In Wenatchee High School between 2024 and 2025 Report Card data, the student demographics show that 2,082 students have attended/enrolled in WHS on October 1. In addition, 48.1% of the students are identified as Female, 51.6% of the students are identified as Male, and 0.3% of the students are identified as Gender X.

Therefore, according to the Report Card data of Wenatchee High School in 2024–2025, when looking at the report for race and ethnicity background for all Students in 2024–2025, the Demographics data show that 0.1% of the students are identified as American Indian/Alaskan Native, 0.8% of the students are identified as Asian, 0.6% of the students as Black/African American, 55.4% of the students are identified as Hispanic/Latino of any race(s), 0% of the students are identified as Native Hawaiian/Pacific Islander, 2.7% of the students are identified as Two or more races, and finally 40.3% of the students are identified as White.

== New campus building and HVAC upgrades ==
In 2025, Wenatchee High School is being planned by the committee of building a new campus and propose a $295 million bond for the school to improve the learning environment for the students, faculty, and staff. The committee is also planning a proposal to upgrade HVAC because in 2024–2025, several schools in Wenatchee have many HVAC systems failing from the hot temperatures, meaning that the air conditioning for Wenatchee schools have not been working properly, which raises many concerns for students, teachers, and staff inside the learning environment.

If the proposal is approved by the board in November 2026, the new campus building of Wenatchee High School and HVAC upgrades for several schools will be finished constructing in between 2029 and 2030.

== Notable alumni ==
- Trey Adams, football player
- Mackenzie Cowell, murder victim
- Duane Francies, military aviator
- Jakob Kasimir Hellrigl (Candy Ken), rapper and model
- Cody O'Connell, football player
- Al Worley, football player
- Elizabeth Zharoff, opera singer

== See also ==
- Wenatchee, Washington
- Wenatchee School District
- Wenatchee Valley College
