= Candy Ken =

Austrian rapper model, TikToker and artist (born 1992)

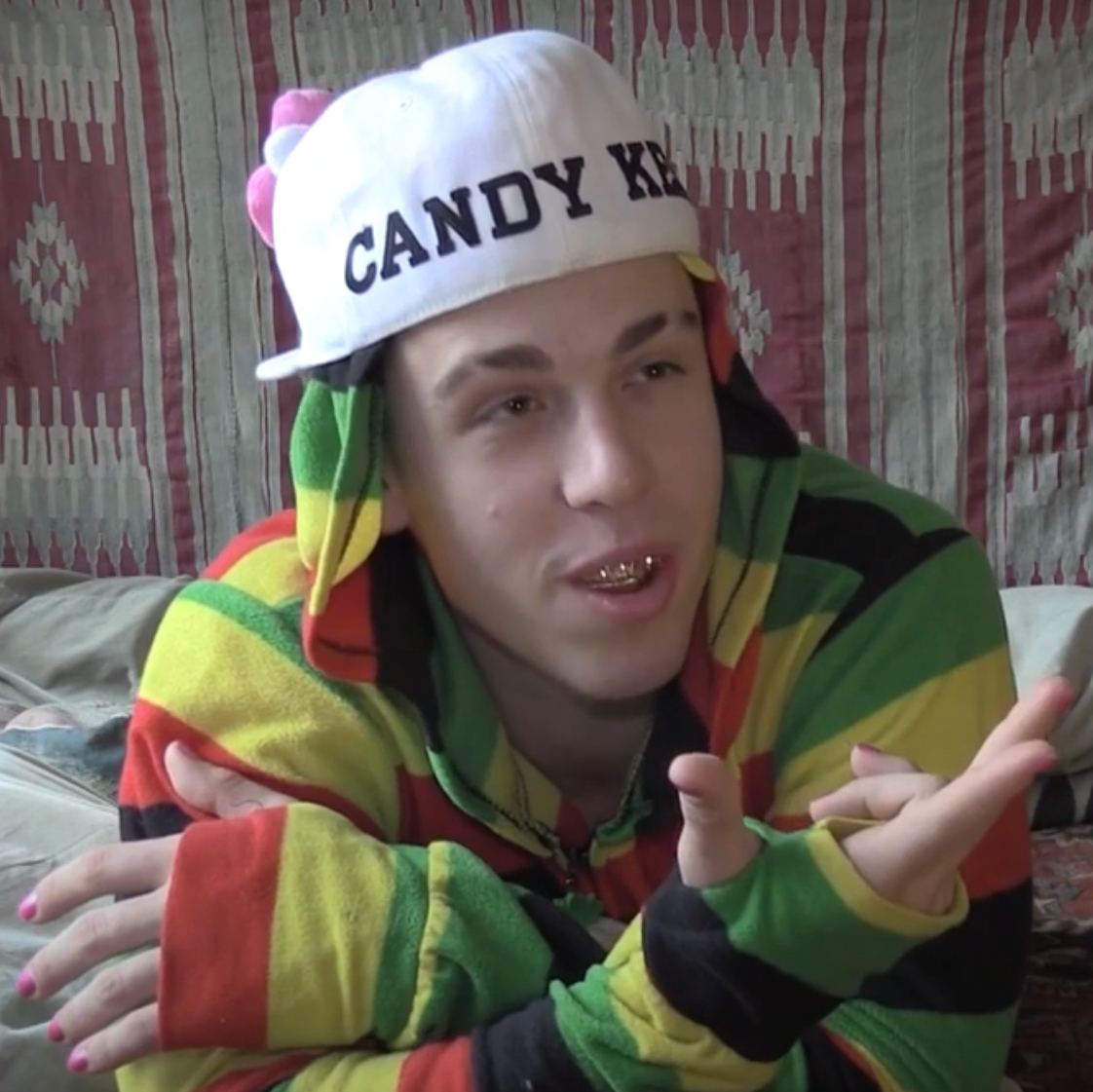
- Candy Ken in 2016
- Born: Jakob Kasimir Hellrigl; July 27, 1992 (age 34); Bregenz, Austria
- Education: Wenatchee High School
- Occupations: Rapper; model; TikToker
- Years active: 2014-present
- Spouse: Baby J (m. 2020)
- Children: 2

Jakob Kasimir Hellrigl (born July 27, 1992), known as Candy Ken, is an Austrian rapper, model, TikToker and artist. He started his career as a rapper in 2014. He combines a masculine appearance with feminine pop culture. He has become famous, and infamous, for his TikTok videos where he shows his wealth and lifestyle throughout the videos that he creates.

== Early life and education ==
Hellrigl was born in Bregenz, Austria, on July 27, 1992. He studied photography and film design at the Lette-Verein college in Berlin, but dropped out of his studies in 2014. He attended Wenatchee High School at Wenatchee, Washington for a year where he played football. During his high school years, he met his two best female friends, whose whereabouts are unknown, Isabella and Payton, who he has said inspired him to pursue his music career. While studying at college, he invented the gender-bending persona of Candy Ken, incorporating imagery from Hello Kitty, Japanese Kawaii culture, Barbie dolls and pink clothing in his dress style and visual appearance. Welcome to Candy Land in 2014 as a self-directed video series on YouTube. The music is produced by Lets Go Radio, and distributed by Spinnup.

The video series was re-made as a short film Welcome to Candy Land, which won an award at the Austrian short film festival Alpinale in 2015. In September 2015 he released the second EP Candy Ken Paradise produced by DJ Smokera and distributed by Spinnup. In November 2015 he released a third EP, Daddy 69, containing five songs and five videos. Four videos are directed by him, and the video for the song "69" is directed by London-based underground director Kassandra Powell.

In June 2016 he released his first album Real Talk containing twelve songs, ten of which were made in collaboration with the rapper Gigi Tays. The release of the album was promoted with a club party at Visions Video Bar in London. The album was also produced by Smokera and the video for the song "What I Like" directed by Powell. He mentions the American rapper Riff Raff as his main musical and artistic influence for the album. Candy Ken appeared on Jimmy Kimmel Live! in April 2018, on a segment of Guess Who's High.

=== Modeling ===
His modeling career started when he was noticed on Instagram in 2015 by stylist and Diesel brand creative designer Nicola Formichetti, who invited him to do a photo shoot for a photo session in Formichetti's Japanese magazine FREE. Formichetti introduced him to the photographer Terry Richardson, who also made a photo shoot with him in full frontal nudity for the magazine Man about Town. At the same time he was booked as a fashion model by the Italian Diesel clothing brand at the Pride Week in New York City. He also made a runway appearance at the opening for designer Roberto Piqueras' fashion show at Berlin's alternative fashion week, and for Japanese fashion designer Michiko Koshino. He has been in photo shoot sessions for VMAN magazine, Paper magazine, Vogue Taiwan, and the Korean edition of Dazed magazine

== Discography ==
=== Albums ===
- Real Talk (2016)
- Flamingo (2018)

=== Singles ===
- "Welcome to Candy Land" (2015)
- "Basic Bitches" (2015)
- "Candy Ken Paradise" (2015)
- "Daddy69" (2015)
- "Candy Trap" (2017)
- "Send Nudes" (2017)
- ”Cybertruck” (2025)
