= Markus Gasser =

Austrian literary scholar and author (born 1967)

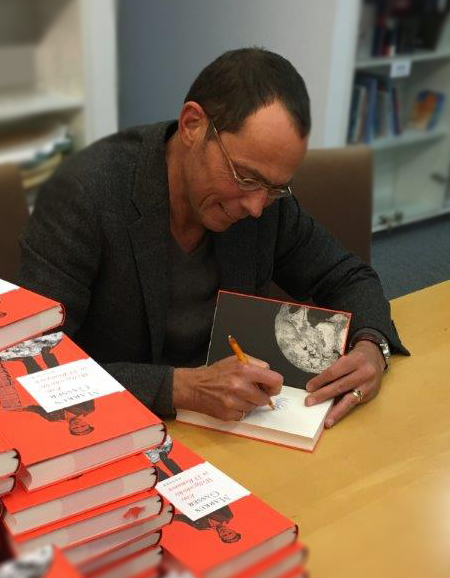
- Gasser at a book signing in 2015
- Born: 1967 (age 58–59); Bregenz, Austria
- Occupations: Literary scholar and author
- Website: http://m-gasser.ch/home

Markus Gasser (born 1967) is an Austrian literary scholar and author.

== Life ==
Markus Gasser was born in Bregenz in 1967. After the gymnasium, he went to the University of Innsbruck for German, English and American studies. He attained a habilitation in 2007 with the thesis "The Collapse of the Platonic cave" (German: Die Sprengung der platonischen Höhle).

Markus Gasser lives in Zurich, Switzerland, and is an Austrian citizen. He lives there with his wife and leads a lively life as an author and lecturer in the region.

== Works ==
- Die Sprengung der platonischen Höhle: Roman und Philosophie im Widerstreit (in German). Göttingen: Wallstein Verlag. 2007. ISBN 978-3-8353-0139-9.
- Das Königreich im Meer. Daniel Kehlmanns Geheimnis (in German). Göttingen: Wallstein Verlag. 2010. ISBN 978-3-8353-0617-2.
- Das Königreich im Meer. Daniel Kehlmanns Geheimnis (in German). Reinbek bei Hamburg: Rowohlt Taschenbuch Verlag. 2013. ISBN 978-3-499-25852-7.
- Das Buch der Bücher für die Insel (in German). München: Hanser Verlag. 2014. ISBN 978-3-446-24495-5.
- Eine Weltgeschichte in 33 Romanen (in German). München: Hanser Verlag. 2015. ISBN 978-3-446-24919-6.
- Die Launen der Liebe. Hanser, München 2019, ISBN 978-3-446-25839-6.
- Die Verschwörung der Krähen. Novel. C.H.Beck, München 2022, ISBN 978-3-406-78150-6.
- Lil. Novel. C.H.Beck, München 2024, ISBN 978-3-406-81375-7.
