= Duane Francies =

Merritt Duane Francies
- Lieutenants Duane Francies and William Martin by the small plane flown on reconnaissance missions over France and Germany.
- Born: July 15, 1921; Wenatchee, Washington
- Died: May 5, 2004 (aged 82); Chelan, Washington
- Military career
- Allegiance: United States of America
- Branch: United States Army Air Forces
- Service years: 1941-1946
- Rank: First lieutenant
- Nicknames: Bo, Doc
- Commands: 5th Armored Division; 7lst Armored Field Artillery Battalion
- Conflicts: World War II
- Awards: Bronze Star; Legion of Merit; Distinguished Flying Cross

First lieutenant Duane Francies (July 15, 1921 – May 5, 2004) was a military aviator who earned the Distinguished Flying Cross for his service.

== Early life ==
He was the only son of Merritt Charles Francies and Kathleen Horan Francies. Duane witnessed the landing of Clyde Pangborn and Hugh Herndon after the first nonstop trans-Pacific flight, driving his desire to be a pilot. After graduation from Wenatchee High School in 1939, he attended Seattle Pacific College and Wenatchee Valley College where he had civilian pilot training.

== Military service ==
Three days after Pearl Harbor, Francies enlisted with the Army. Along with his observer William Martin, both used their Colt 45 to down a German Storch on April 11, 1945. This story was related in Cornelius Ryan's book The Last Battle (Ryan) in 1966. Twice recommended for a Distinguished Flying Cross during the war, it was not until Scoop Jackson took up the issue and the medal was awarded in 1967.(Martin had already been awarded the DFC years before)

== Later life ==
After WW2, Francies worked for Foote Mineral Co. for 23 years. He was a member of Sigma Phi Epsilon fraternity, Kiwanis, Experimental Aircraft Association, and member of St. Andrews Episcopal Church.
