= Roman Rafreider =

Austrian television host and journalist

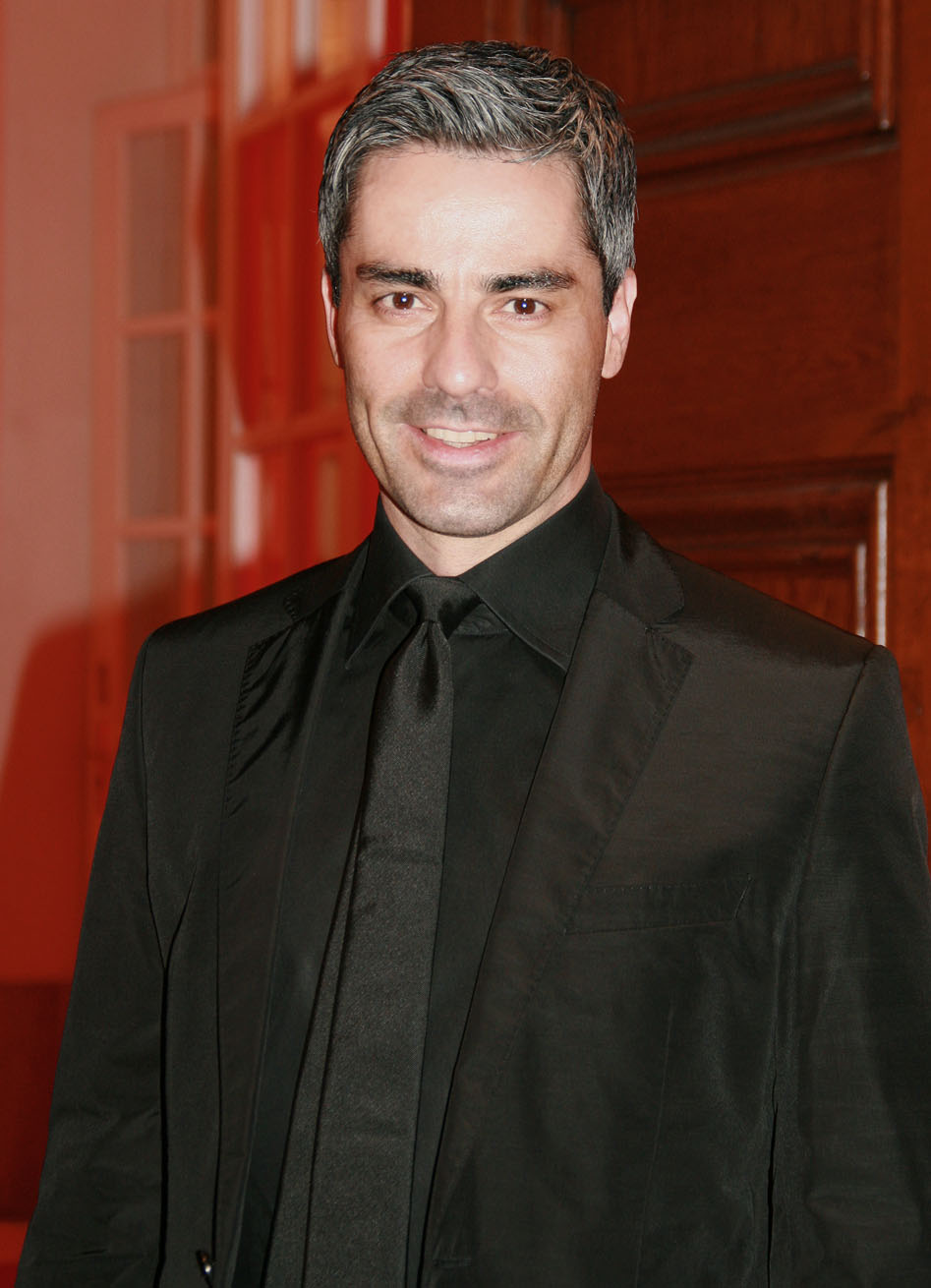
- Roman Rafreider at the Austrian Romy Awards
- Born: 22 November 1969 (age 56); Bregenz, Austria
- Occupations: Television host; journalist

Roman Rafreider (born 22 November 1969) is an Austrian television host and journalist.

== Life ==
Rafreider studied political science and law in Vienna, Paris and Innsbruck. During his studies, he worked at different newspaper companies. He started his journalistic career in 1995 at the ORF-Landesstudio Vorarlberg, where he worked as an editor and radio host. In 1998, he also hosted the show Vorarlberg heute.

In 1999, he switched over to ORF's main news programme Zeit im Bild at their corporate headquarters in Vienna. There, he worked as host and chief editor of ZiB 3. In 2002, Rafreider became host of Thema. Furthermore he hosted ORF's consumer magazine Gut beraten Österreich.

Since April 2007, Rafreider has been the anchorman and chief editor of the new ZiB 20 and the ZiB 24 (at midnight) on ORF eins. After a temporary special leave of absence due to a conflict with his former partner – which was mainly taken up in an unobjective way by tabloid media – he was responsible for the development of new information programmes on ORF eins from February 2019. Since 12 March 2020, he has again hosted the news programmes ZIB 18, ZIB 20, ZIB Nacht and ZIB Flash and is also head of news programs at ORF.
