= Bregenz =

Capital of Vorarlberg, Austria

Bregenz Breagaz (Alemannic German)
- Municipality
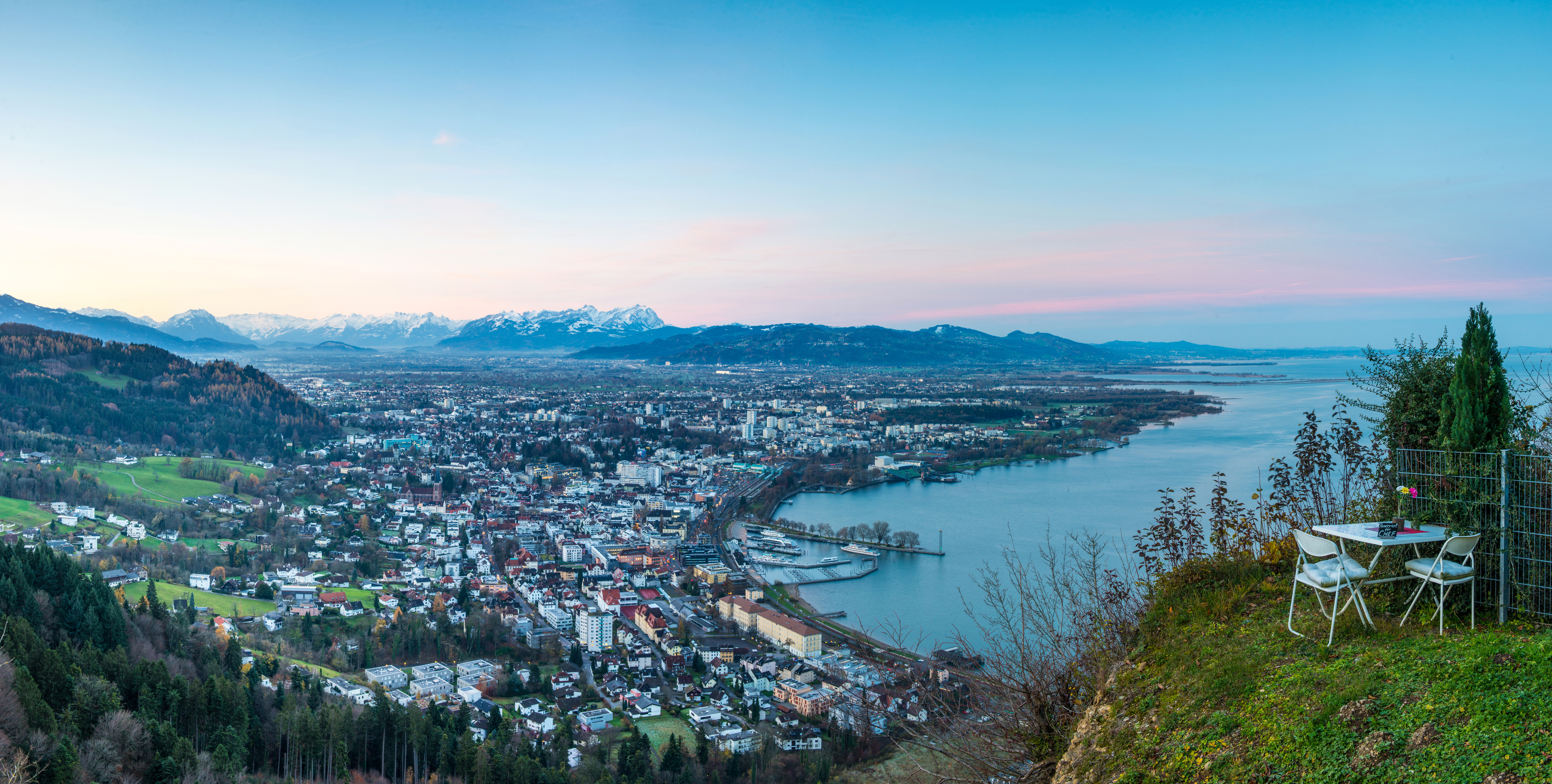
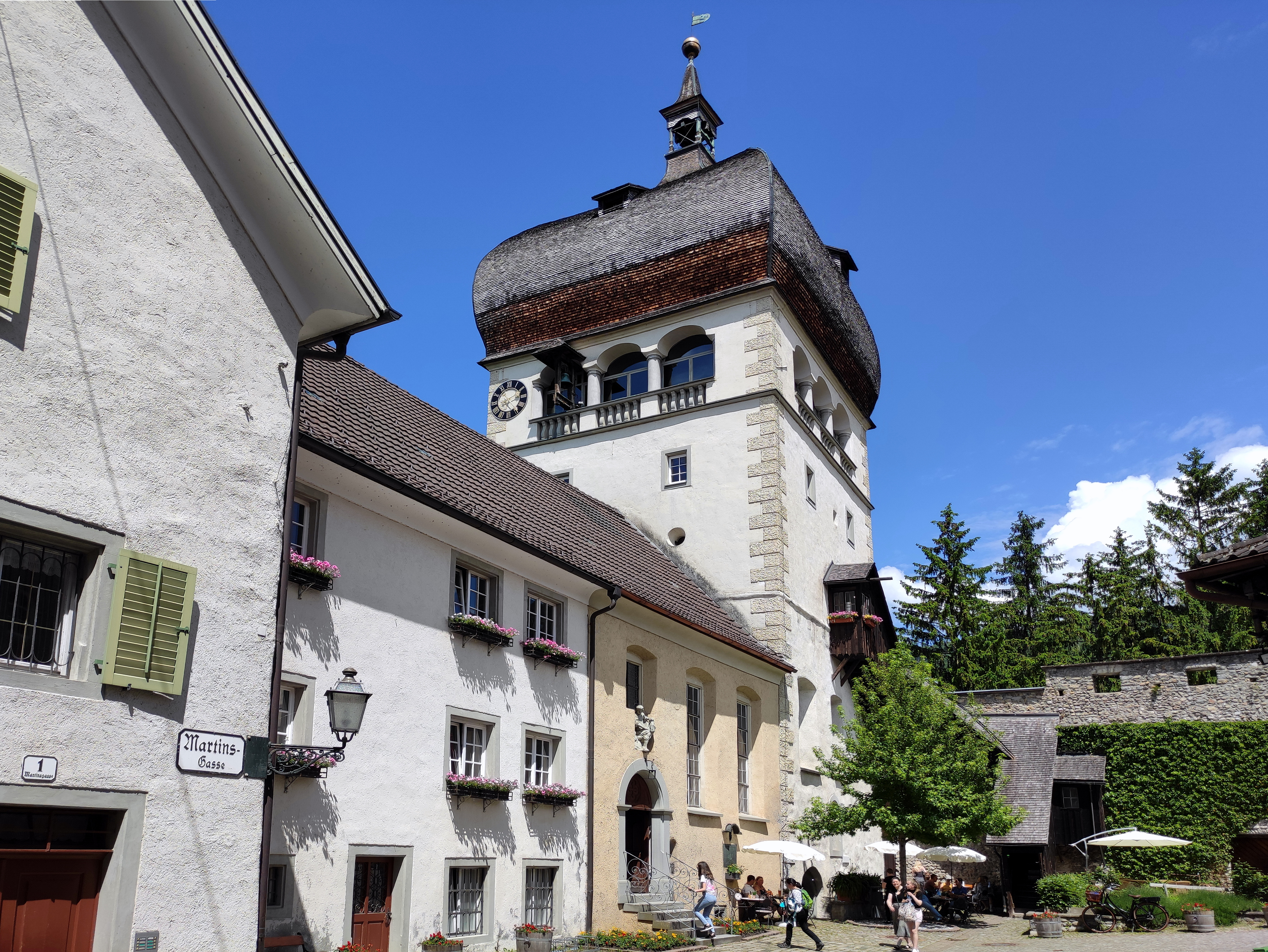
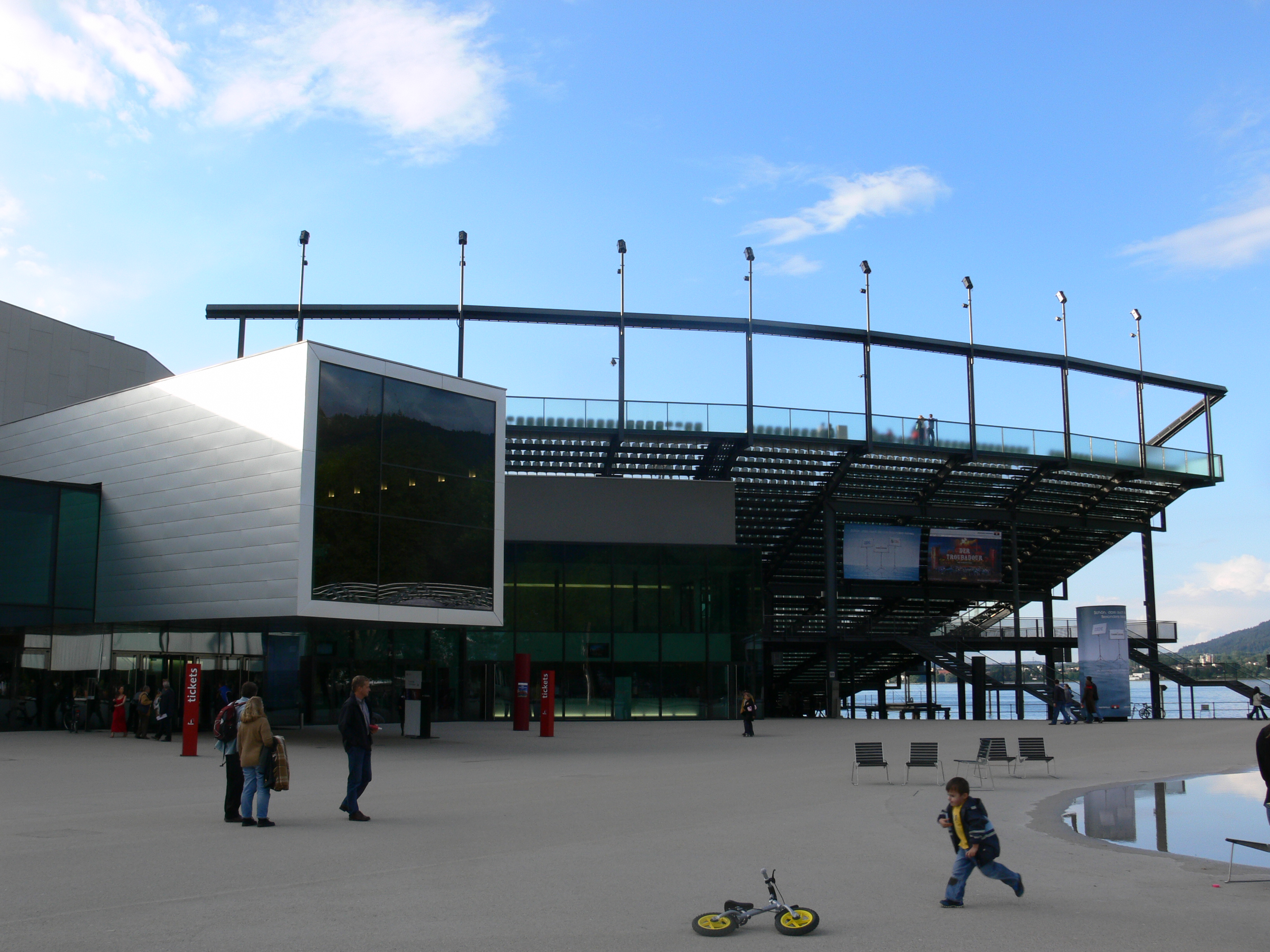
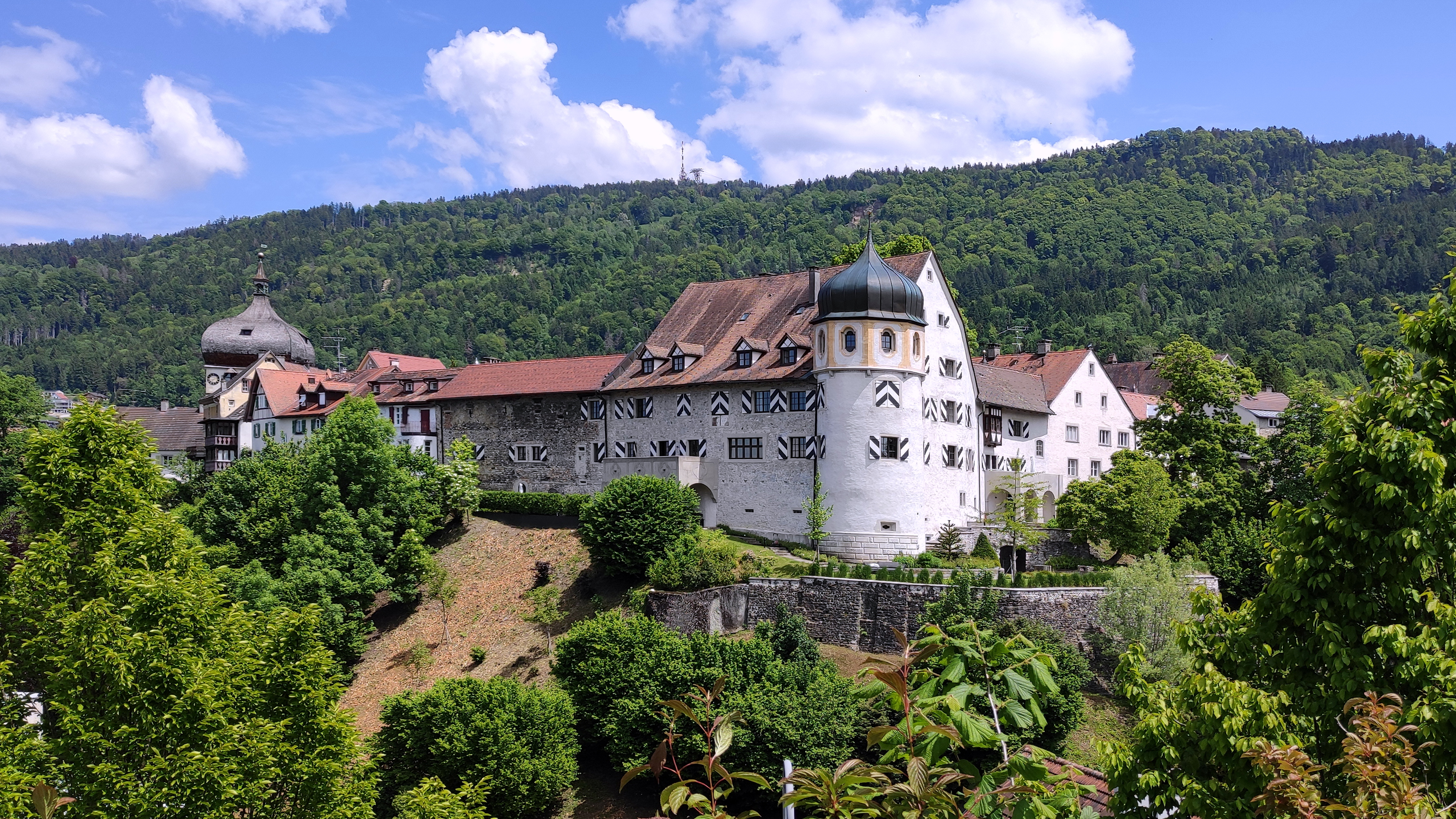
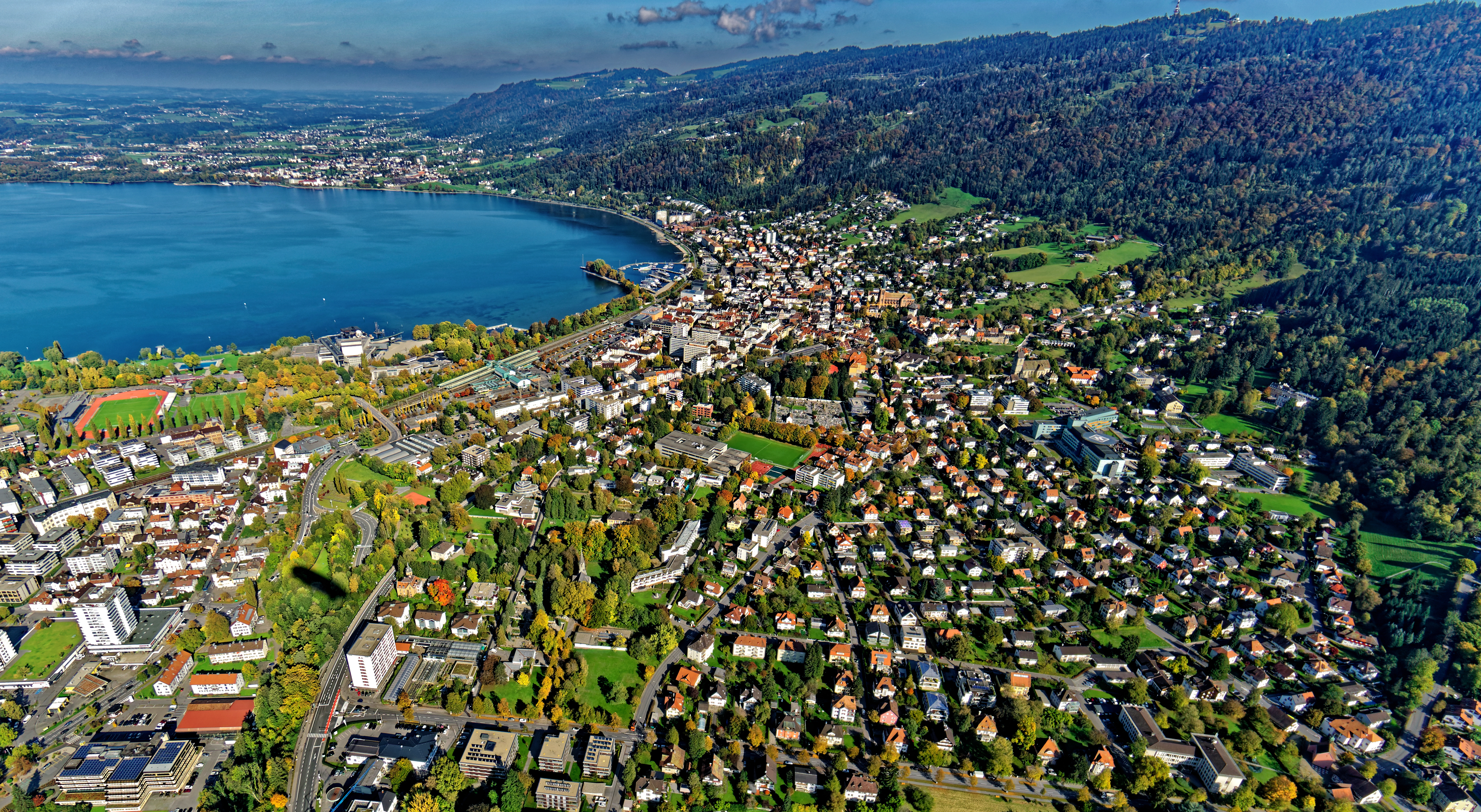
- Clockwise from top: view of the city, Festspielhaus with stage, aerial view of the city, Oberstadt, Martinsturm

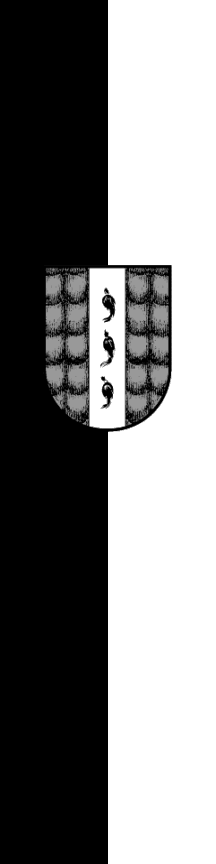
- Flag Coat of arms

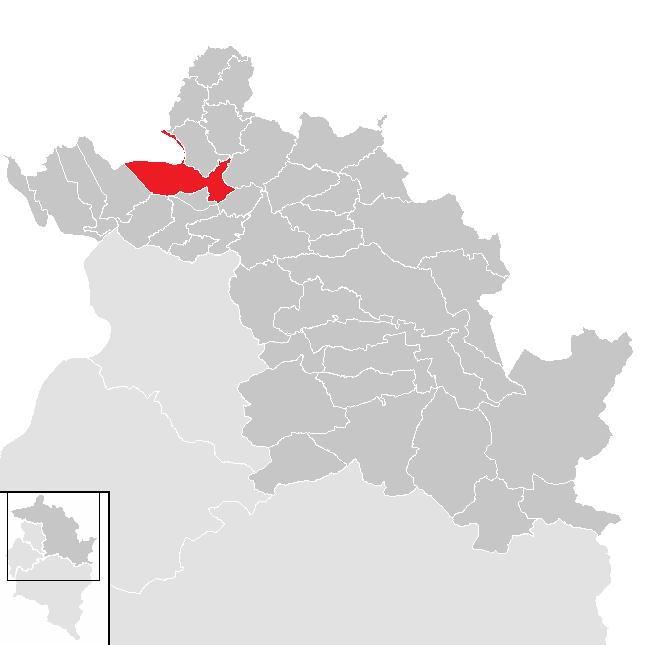
- Location in the district

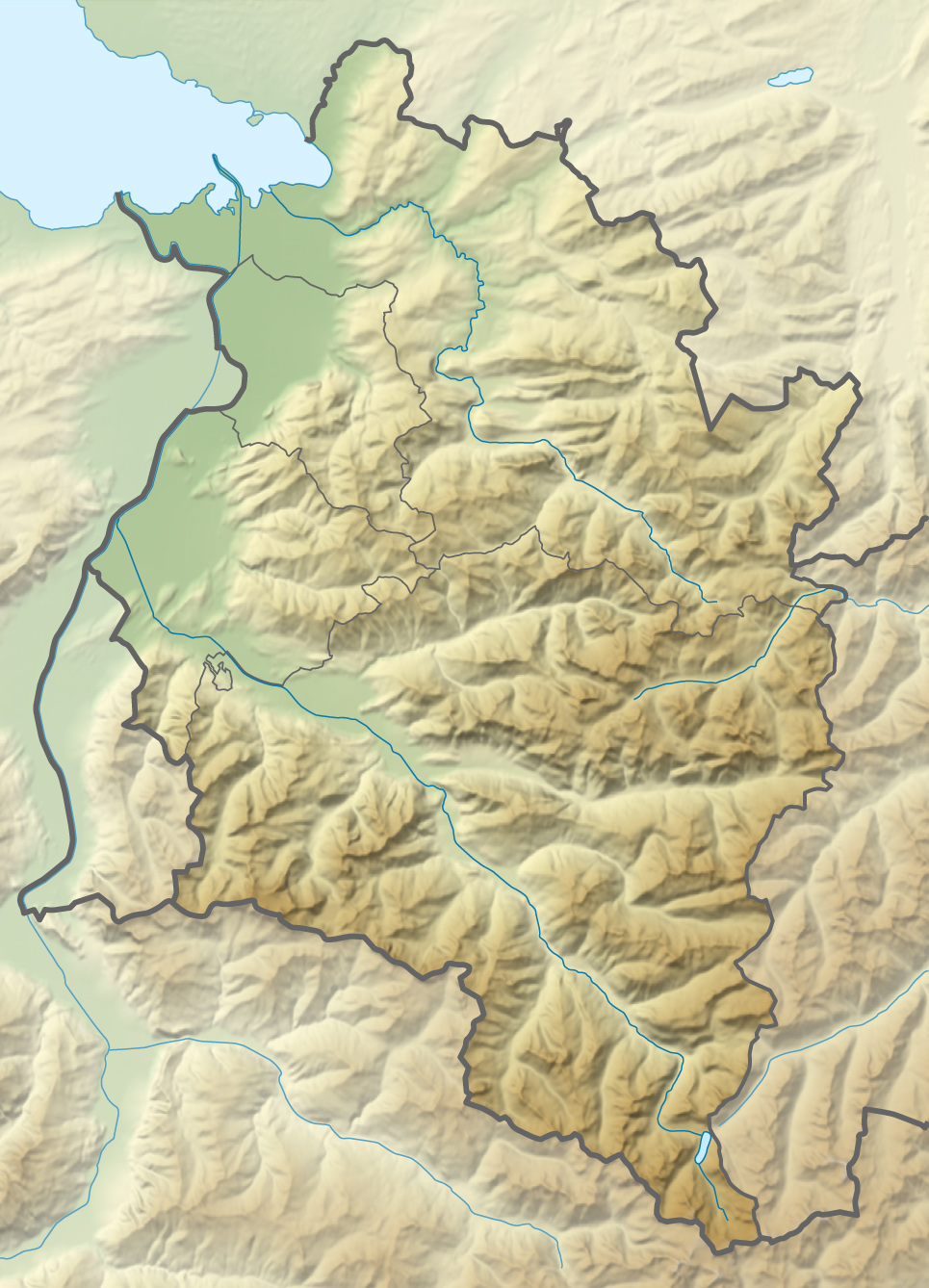
- Location within Vorarlberg Location within Austria
- Coordinates: 47°30′18″N 09°44′57″E
- Country: Austria
- State: Vorarlberg
- District: Bregenz

Government
  - Mayor: Michael Ritsch (SPÖ)

Area
  - Total: 29.5 km^{2} (11.4 sq mi)
- Elevation: 427 m (1,401 ft)

Population (2023-01-01)
  - Total: 29,620
  - Density: 1,000/km^{2} (2,600/sq mi)
- Demonym(s): Bregenzer (m.); Bregenzerin (f.) (de)
- Time zone: UTC+1 (CET)
  - Summer (DST): UTC+2 (CEST)
- Postal code: 6900
- Area code: 05574
- Vehicle registration: B
- Website: www.bregenz.at

Bregenz (German: [ˈbʁeːɡɛnts]; Vorarlbergian: Breagaz [ˈb̥rea̯ɡ̊ats]) is the capital of Vorarlberg, the westernmost state of Austria. The city lies on the east and southeast shores of Lake Constance, the third-largest freshwater lake in Central Europe (river Rhine), between Switzerland in the west and Germany in the northwest and big forests in the east - the Bregenzerwald.

Bregenz is located on a plateau falling in a series of terraces to the lake at the foot of Pfänder mountain. It is a junction of the arterial roads from the Rhine valley to the German Alpine foothills, with cruise ship services on Lake Constance.

It is famous for the annual summer music festival Bregenzer Festspiele, as well as the dance festival Bregenzer Spring.

== History ==
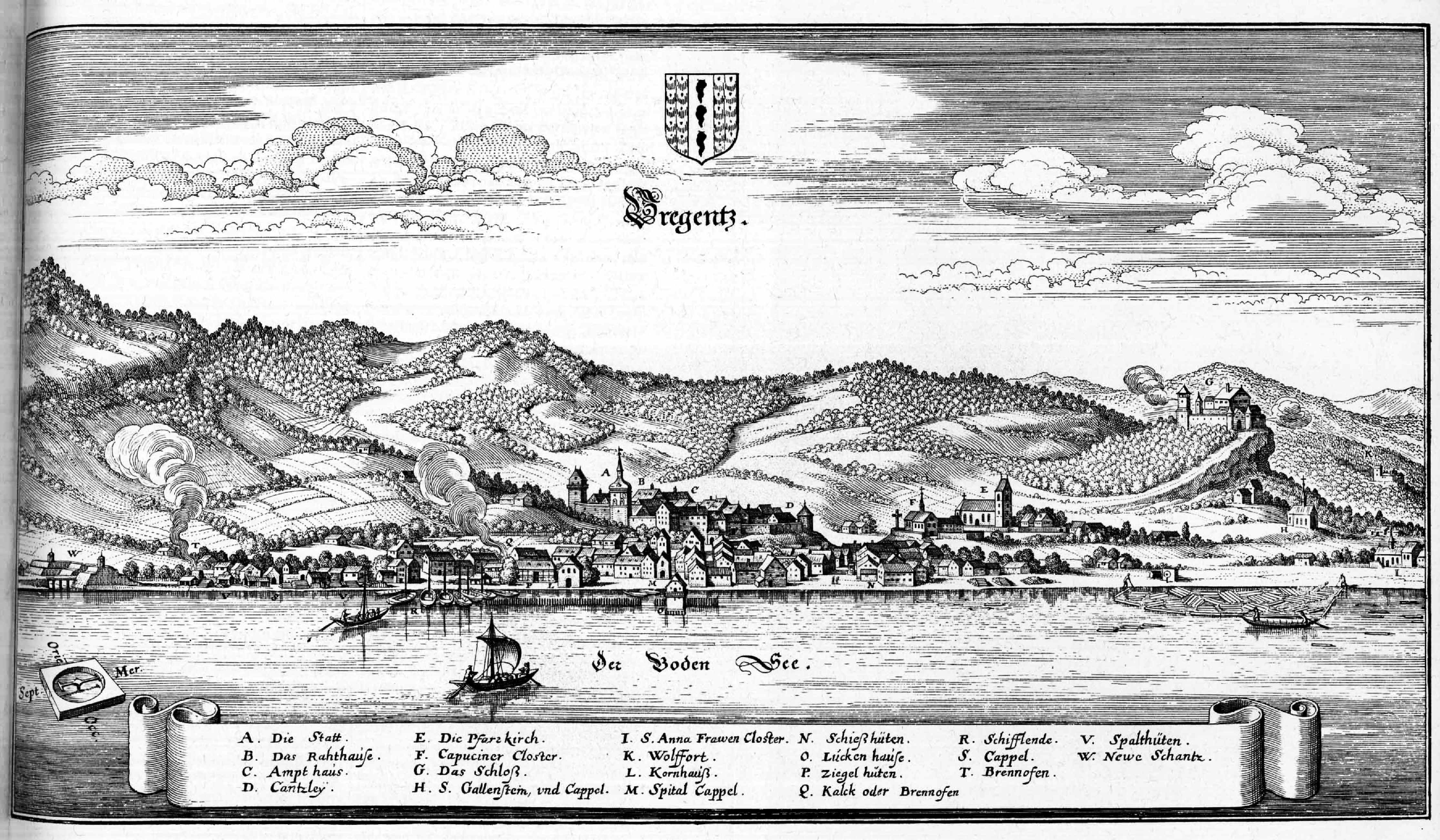
Bregenz, Chalcography by Caspar Merian, about 1650

The first settlements date from 1500 BC. The Brigantii are mentioned by Strabo as a Celtic sub-tribe in this region of the Alps. In the 5th century BC, the Celts settled at Brigantion, which became one of their most heavily fortified locations. After a series of battles in 15 BC, the Romans conquered Brigantion and the city became a Roman camp. It was conferred the status of a municipality (Brigantium) around 50 AD. Brigantium was the seat of the Roman admiralty for Lake Constance and included a theatre. In 259/60, Brigantium was destroyed by the Alemanni, Germanic peoples who settled in the area in around 450.

From 610 to 612, Saint Columbanus and Saint Gall worked as missionaries in Bregenz. From 917 onwards, the castle served as a residence of the Udalrichinger (ruling dynasty of Vorarlberg), who called themselves Counts of Bregenz. The house died out around 1150. The son of the first Ulrich was Saint Gebhard, born in 947. He became the Bishop of Konstanz. In around 1170, Hugo of Tübingen (Montfort) founded a town settlement (first documented in 1249), enlarged it in the 13th and 14th centuries and from 1650 to 1652.

The city was sold in 1451, and again in 1523, to the Habsburgs and continued under Austrian rule, with a brief occupation by Swedish forces under Carl Gustaf Wrangel during the 30 Years' War, until the 19th century. Bregenz was under Bavarian rule from 1805 to 1814. From 1842 to 1850, the harbour on Lake Constance was built, then enlarged in 1883 and from 1889 to 1891, and Austrian ship service was inaugurated in 1884. Railway services have existed since 1872, and since 1884 across the Arlberg massif.

Since 1726, Bregenz has been the main seat of Austrian administration in Vorarlberg (Obervogtei, in 1786 Kreisamt, since 1861 seat of the Landtag, since 1918 seat of the Landeshauptmann). Rieden-Vorkloster and Fluh were incorporated into Bregenz in 1919 and 1946, respectively.

The town was bombed by the Allies in 1945; 72 houses were destroyed. French Troops established the military government in April/May 1945. The then-annual summer music festival Bregenzer Festspiele with the Vienna Symphony Orchestra started in 1946.

== Demographics ==
Historical population

Year	Pop.	±%
1869	5,223	—
1880	6,691	+28.1%
1890	9,576	+43.1%
1900	11,455	+19.6%
1910	13,687	+19.5%
1923	13,289	−2.9%

Year	Pop.	±%
1934	14,999	+12.9%
1939	15,098	+0.7%
1951	20,277	+34.3%
1961	21,428	+5.7%
1971	23,179	+8.2%
1981	24,561	+6.0%

Year	Pop.	±%
1991	27,097	+10.3%
2001	26,752	−1.3%
2006	27,035	+1.1%
2011	27,831	+2.9%

Source: Statistik Austria

Largest groups of foreign residents
Nationality	Population (2026)
Germany	1,589
Turkey	1,427
Syria	613
Russian Federation	564
Serbia	549
Romania	402
Bosnia and Herzegovina	377
Croatia	344
Hungary	265
Italy	255
Ukraine	223
Afghanistan	198
Bulgaria	149
Slovakia	98
North Macedonia	94
Poland	88
Iraq	66
Kosovo	58
Slovenia	51
Czech Republic	38
Iran	33

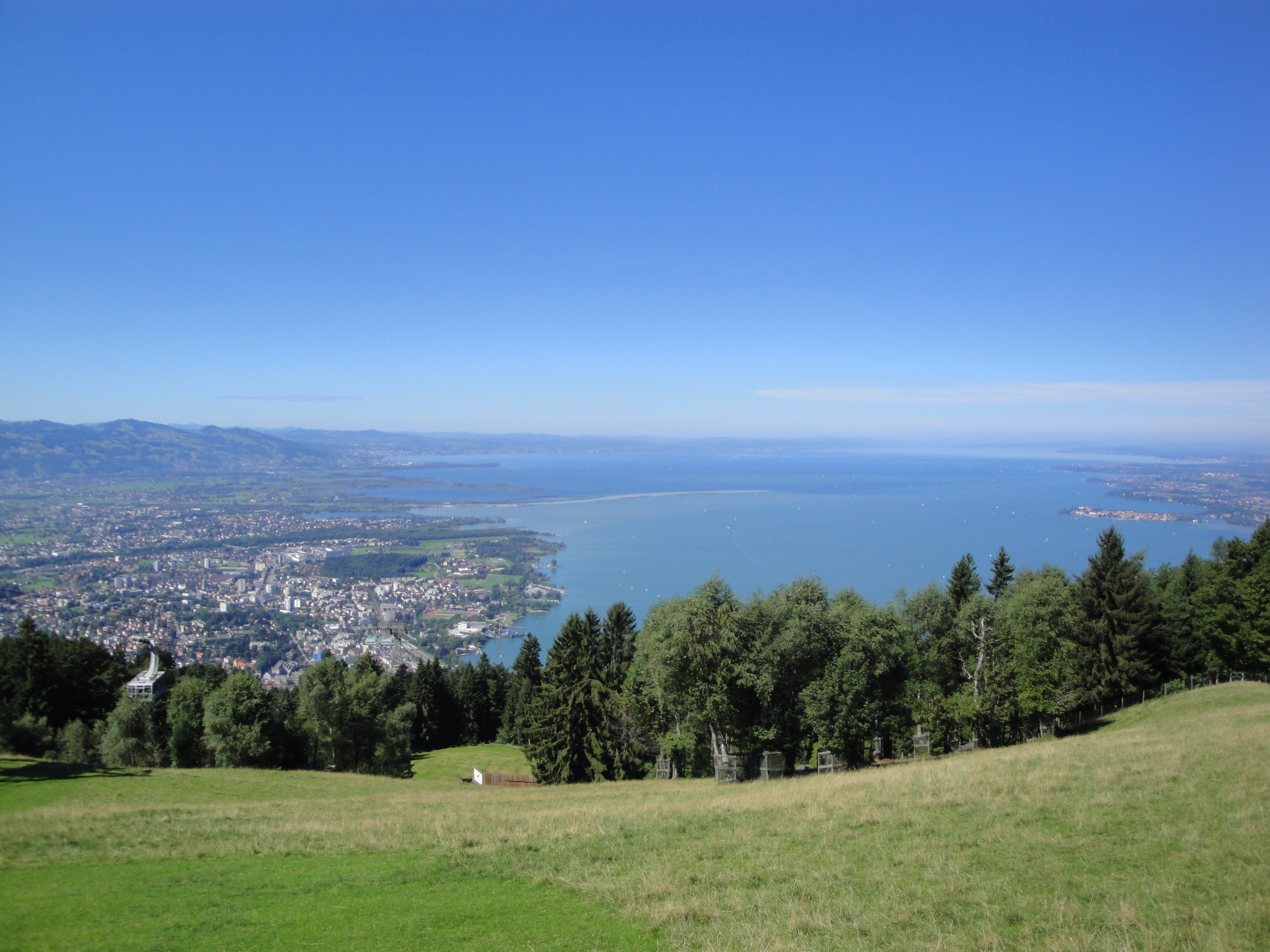
The Pfänder, a panoramic point of Bregenz.

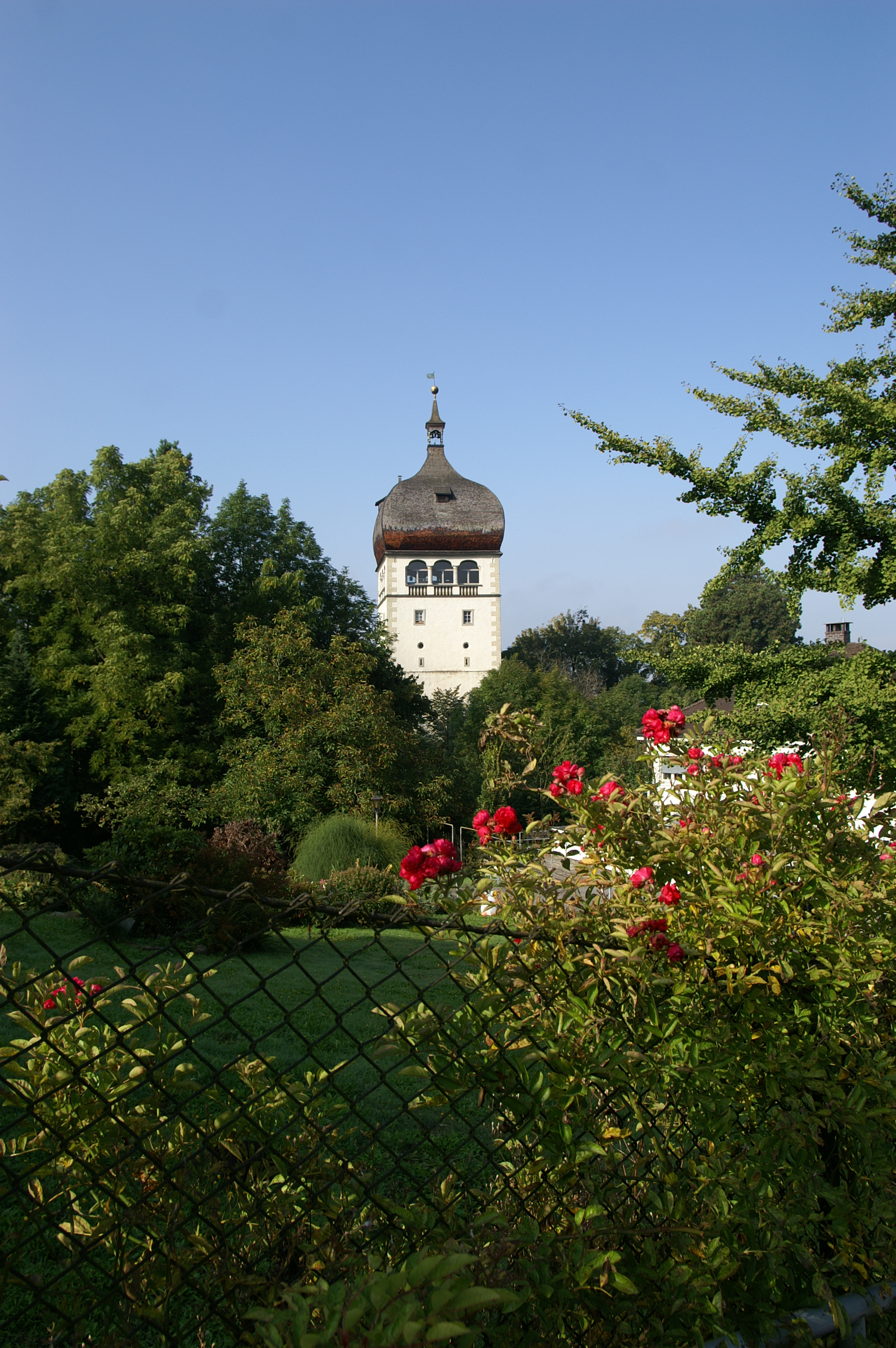
The Martinsturm, built in 1601.

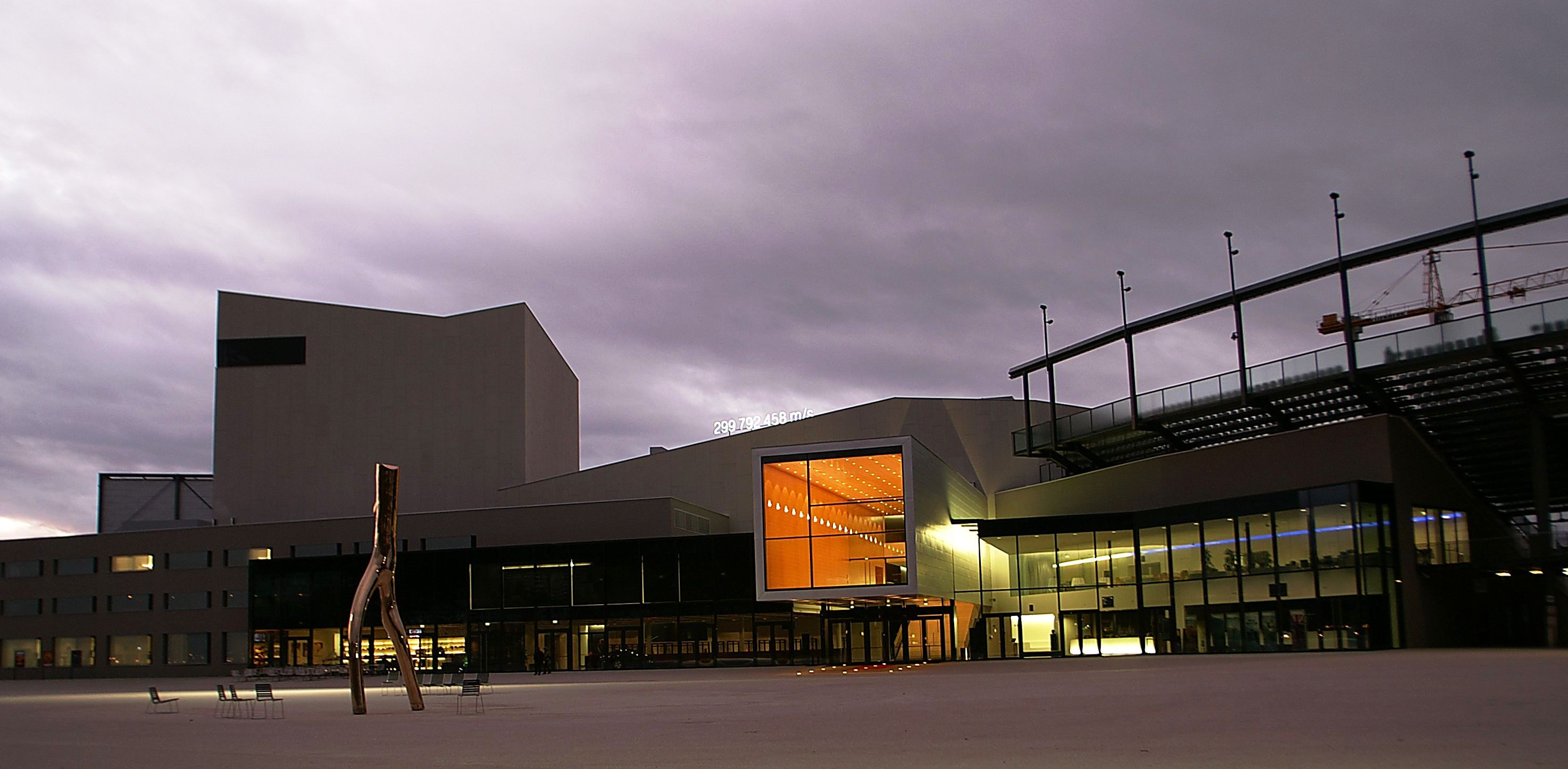
Congress and Culture Center.

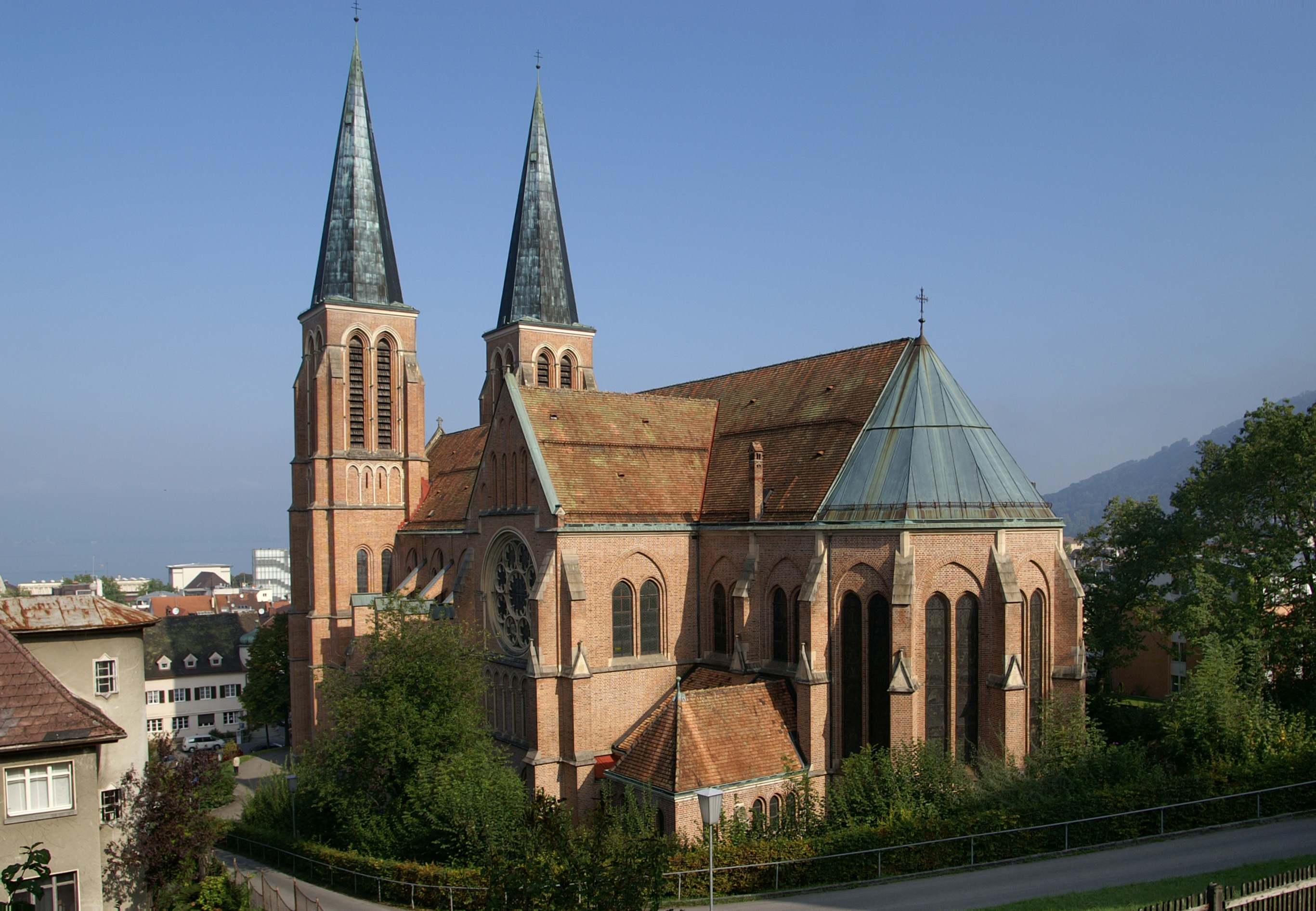
Sacred Heart Church.

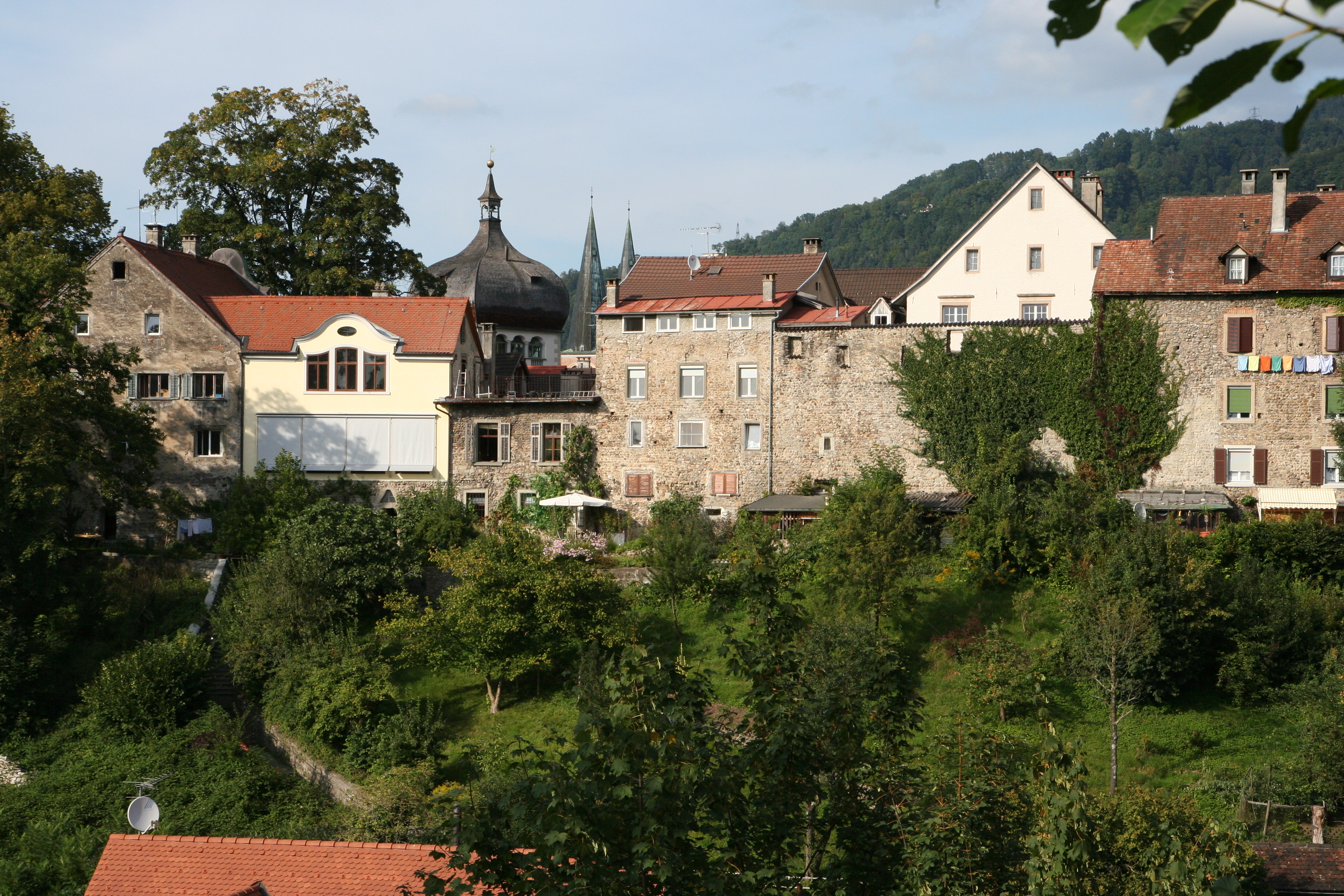
Ancient city wall, upper town.

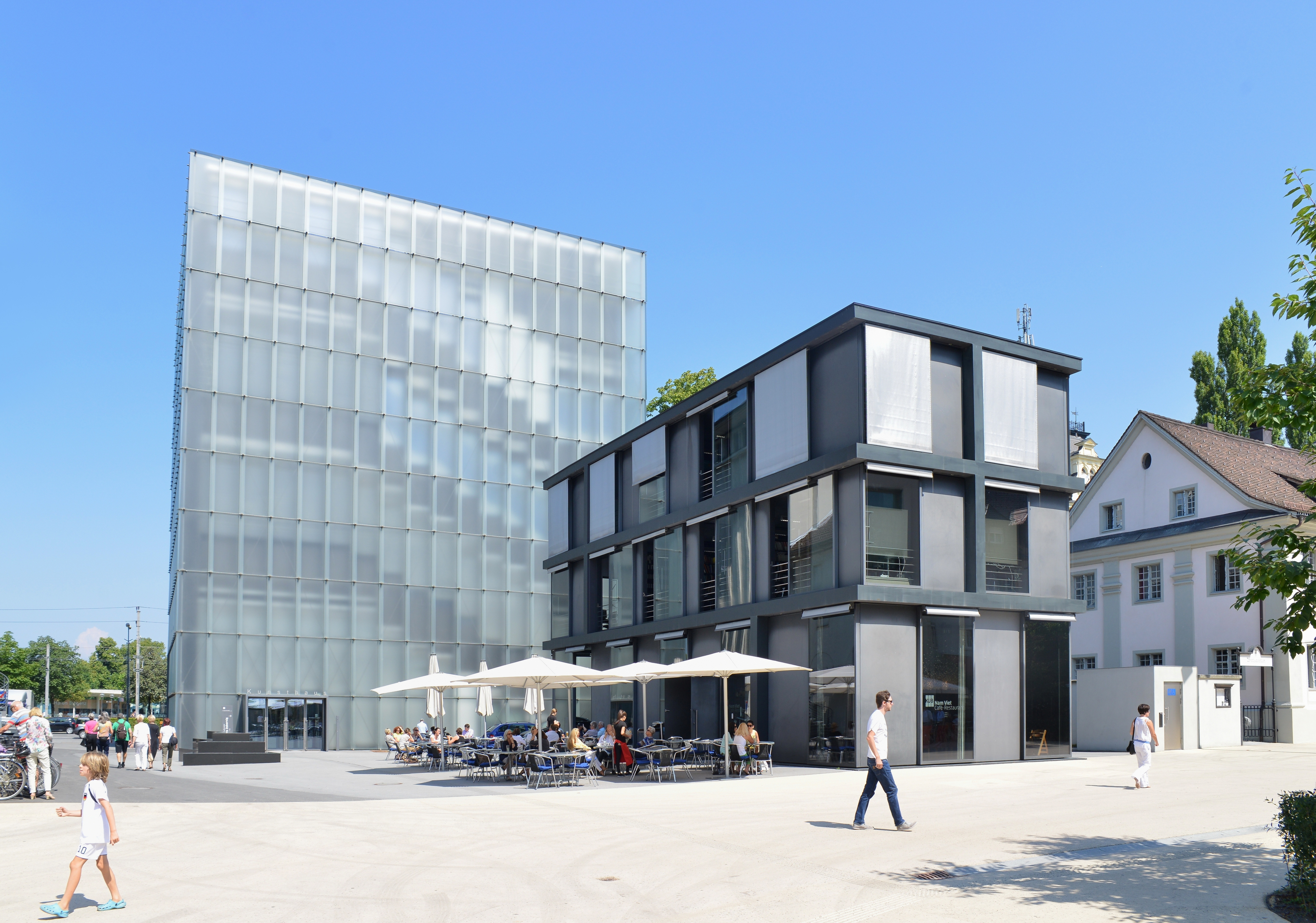
Kunsthaus Bregenz

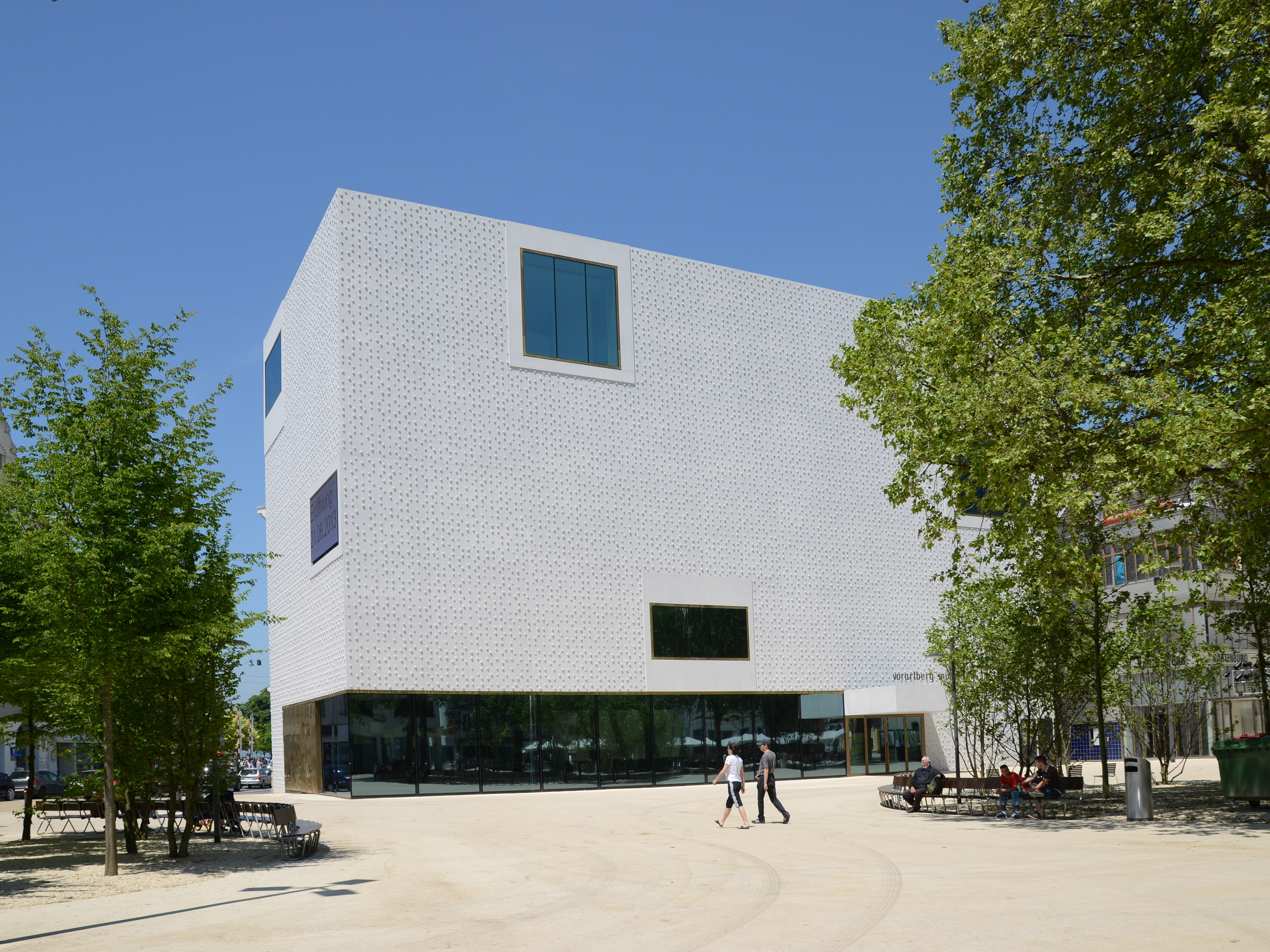
Vorarlberg museum

== Main sights ==
=== Upper town ===
- Remains from the 13th and 16th centuries
- Town walls
- Old town hall (1662)
- Martinsturm (Martin's Tower). Originally built by the Romans, it has a chapel with frescoes dating from 1362. Between 1599 and 1601, an additional storey was added. It has the largest bulb-shaped Baroque steeple in Central Europe and houses the Museum of Military History.
- Gothic parish church of St Gall: its Romanesque foundations date from before 1380, but it was rebuilt around 1480. Around 1737, it was converted to a Baroque style.
- Herz-Jesu parish church (1905–1908).

=== Lower town ===
- Floating stage on lake Constance
- Town hall, built in 1686 (façade from 1898)
- Gothic Seekapelle (Lake Chapel)
- Landhaus (built from 1973 to 1982 by W. Holzbauer)
- Former Kornhausmarkt (built 1838 to 1940, altered 1951 to 1955); it now houses a theatre.
- Protestant church of the Sacred Cross (1862–1864)
- Church of St Kolumban (1962–1966)
- Kunsthaus Bregenz (1991–1997) (modern art museum)
- Tourismushaus (tourist centre) (1994–1998).

Sights in the district of Vorkloster include the Maria Hilf parish church (1925–1931, by C. Holzmeister, interior from 1980) and the Cistercian monastery of Mehrerau.

On the Gebhardsberg rock are remains of the fortress of Hohenbregenz (destroyed by the Swedes in 1647).

== Education ==
=== Schools and the arts ===
Bregenz is home to four Gymnasium secondary schools, a commercial college (HAK), a technical college (HTL), upper secondary business schools (Höhere Lehranstalt für wirtschaftliche Berufe), three Berufsschulen (vocational schools), crafts colleges, the Academy of Social Sciences, and a nursing school. Others include: an adult education centre, school boarding houses, state archives, a state library, a state museum, Kunsthaus Bregenz (modern arts centre), Künstlerhaus (art centre), Thurn und Taxis Palace, five monasteries, Heimatwerk (autonomous institution fostering the manufacturing of traditional craft products), and various newspapers.

=== Public facilities ===
Festival and Congress centre, Theater am Kornmarkt, casino, harbour for sailing boats and yachts, cable car up onto the Pfänder mountain.

== Politics ==
=== Municipal assembly ===
The municipal assembly (Gemeindevertretung) consists of 36 members. Following the 2025 Vorarlberg local elections, it is made up of the following parties:

- Social Democratic Party of Austria (SPÖ): 16 seats
- Austrian People's Party (ÖVP): 11 seats
- Freedom Party of Austria (FPÖ): 4 seats
- The Greens - The Green Alternative (GRÜNE): 4 seats
- NEOS - The New Austria and Liberal Forum (NEOS): 1 seat

The mayor of Bregenz, Michael Ritsch (SPÖ), was re-elected in 2025.

=== Vorarlberg state assembly ===
Bregenz is the seat of the Vorarlberg State Assembly (Landtag), and of most of the provincial authorities/institutions of Vorarlberg (e.g. school superintendent, police headquarters, department of human resources development (AMS), Office for Environmental Protection, Chamber of Labour, Economics Chamber, Chamber of Agriculture, Chamber of Pharmacists, military regional headquarters, military garrison, one of the main hospitals of the province (Landeskrankenhaus), as well as a sanatorium, farmers' health and social insurance office, VLV (Mutual Fire Insurance Institute).

=== Consulates ===
A consulate-general of Turkey, and honorary consulates of Belarus, France, Germany, Hungary, Norway, and Switzerland are located in Bregenz. Honorary consulates of Finland and the United Kingdom are located in nearby Lauterach, and an honorary consulate of Brazil in nearby Hard.

== Economy ==
The economy of Bregenz is mainly dominated by small businesses in the services, trade and industry sectors: these include the textile industry (Wolford AG), fittings manufacturer Julius Blum GmbH, glass processing and machine construction.

Bi-seasonal tourism is important; a major attraction is the Bregenz Festival (since 1946, floating stage since 1949, modernised in 1979, Festival and Congress Hall in 1980), winter sports on the Pfänder mountain.

== Culture ==
=== Bregenzer Festspiele ===
The annual summer music festival Bregenzer Festspiele is world-famous, taking place in July and August each year on and around a stage on Lake Constance. This festival attracts more than 150,000 people every year to Bregenz (2011: 166,453, 2016: 159,172) and has a budget of around EUR 20 million. The program changes every two years.

In addition to the performances on the lake stage, orchestral concerts and operas also take place in the adjacent festival theatre. There is also a children's and youth program during and before the beginning of the festival.

The lake stage (Seebühne) is the largest open-air lake stage theatre in the world, with an audience capacity of around 7,000.

=== Bregenz Jazz Festival ===
Since 2014, the Bregenz Jazz Festival has been held every year in June at the Kornmarktplatz. It is the successor of the New Orleans Festival, which took place from 1999 to 2013, during the early summer, in the inner city of Bregenz, and which was no longer supported by the initiator Markus Linder. In addition to the change of name, there was also a musical genre change from blues to jazz. The location and the timing stayed roughly the same.

=== Bregenzer Frühling ===
Since 1987, Bregenzer Spring, a dance festival, has been held every year between March and June in the Festival Hall of Bregenz (Festspielhaus). Dance ensembles from all over the world perform their new productions, along with Austrian premieres. With a budget of around EUR 500,000 and up to 10,000 visitors, Bregenzer Spring is one of the most important dance festivals in Austria.

=== Others ===
- In 2013/2019, a Roman Theatre was excavated in Bregenz.
- The Galgenbihl (gallow hill) is almost forgotten.

== Climate ==
Climate data for Bregenz (1981–2010, extremes 1948–present)
Month	Jan	Feb	Mar	Apr	May	Jun	Jul	Aug	Sep	Oct	Nov	Dec	Year
Record high °C (°F)	17.8 (64.0)	20.7 (69.3)	25.8 (78.4)	31.2 (88.2)	32.5 (90.5)	35.5 (95.9)	37.5 (99.5)	36.3 (97.3)	34.2 (93.6)	29.4 (84.9)	25.4 (77.7)	21.8 (71.2)	37.5 (99.5)
Mean daily maximum °C (°F)	3.6 (38.5)	5.0 (41.0)	9.7 (49.5)	14.2 (57.6)	18.9 (66.0)	21.9 (71.4)	24.2 (75.6)	23.5 (74.3)	19.0 (66.2)	14.0 (57.2)	8.0 (46.4)	4.6 (40.3)	13.9 (57.0)
Daily mean °C (°F)	0.4 (32.7)	1.1 (34.0)	5.0 (41.0)	9.2 (48.6)	14.1 (57.4)	17.3 (63.1)	19.2 (66.6)	18.3 (64.9)	14.2 (57.6)	10.0 (50.0)	4.7 (40.5)	1.6 (34.9)	9.6 (49.3)
Mean daily minimum °C (°F)	−1.6 (29.1)	−1.1 (30.0)	2.3 (36.1)	5.4 (41.7)	9.9 (49.8)	13.0 (55.4)	15.0 (59.0)	14.7 (58.5)	11.4 (52.5)	7.7 (45.9)	2.6 (36.7)	−0.3 (31.5)	6.6 (43.9)
Record low °C (°F)	−19.0 (−2.2)	−23.2 (−9.8)	−16.0 (3.2)	−4.7 (23.5)	−1.8 (28.8)	2.6 (36.7)	4.3 (39.7)	5.4 (41.7)	2.1 (35.8)	−3.2 (26.2)	−10.1 (13.8)	−15.2 (4.6)	−23.2 (−9.8)
Average precipitation mm (inches)	71 (2.8)	75 (3.0)	100 (3.9)	114 (4.5)	146 (5.7)	182 (7.2)	191 (7.5)	177 (7.0)	148 (5.8)	105 (4.1)	108 (4.3)	102 (4.0)	1,521 (59.9)
Average snowfall cm (inches)	22 (8.7)	24 (9.4)	13 (5.1)	3 (1.2)	0 (0)	0 (0)	0 (0)	0 (0)	0 (0)	0 (0)	8 (3.1)	19 (7.5)	88 (35)
Average relative humidity (%) (at 14:00)	76.4	72.0	62.9	57.5	58.8	60.0	60.8	63.4	68.4	74.2	77.4	77.7	67.5
Source: Central Institute for Meteorology and Geodynamics

Climate data for Bregenz (1971–2000)
Month	Jan	Feb	Mar	Apr	May	Jun	Jul	Aug	Sep	Oct	Nov	Dec	Year
Record high °C (°F)	17.0 (62.6)	18.4 (65.1)	25.8 (78.4)	26.9 (80.4)	31.4 (88.5)	34.6 (94.3)	36.6 (97.9)	35.3 (95.5)	34.2 (93.6)	27.4 (81.3)	25.2 (77.4)	21.8 (71.2)	36.6 (97.9)
Mean daily maximum °C (°F)	3.4 (38.1)	4.9 (40.8)	9.5 (49.1)	13.3 (55.9)	18.5 (65.3)	21.3 (70.3)	23.7 (74.7)	23.3 (73.9)	19.2 (66.6)	13.3 (55.9)	7.6 (45.7)	4.6 (40.3)	13.6 (56.5)
Daily mean °C (°F)	0.6 (33.1)	1.5 (34.7)	5.2 (41.4)	8.5 (47.3)	13.5 (56.3)	16.4 (61.5)	18.7 (65.7)	18.2 (64.8)	14.4 (57.9)	9.7 (49.5)	4.6 (40.3)	1.8 (35.2)	9.4 (48.9)
Mean daily minimum °C (°F)	−1.6 (29.1)	−0.9 (30.4)	2.2 (36.0)	4.8 (40.6)	9.3 (48.7)	12.2 (54.0)	14.5 (58.1)	14.4 (57.9)	11.1 (52.0)	7.2 (45.0)	2.3 (36.1)	−0.3 (31.5)	6.3 (43.3)
Record low °C (°F)	−19.0 (−2.2)	−14.4 (6.1)	−15.6 (3.9)	−3.5 (25.7)	−0.3 (31.5)	4.5 (40.1)	7.0 (44.6)	5.8 (42.4)	2.2 (36.0)	−3.4 (25.9)	−9.7 (14.5)	−14.8 (5.4)	−19.0 (−2.2)
Average precipitation mm (inches)	79.1 (3.11)	76.0 (2.99)	86.1 (3.39)	124.2 (4.89)	146.7 (5.78)	203.4 (8.01)	191.0 (7.52)	162.3 (6.39)	138.2 (5.44)	108.5 (4.27)	120.2 (4.73)	94.6 (3.72)	1,530.3 (60.25)
Average snowfall cm (inches)	27.5 (10.8)	23.4 (9.2)	13.8 (5.4)	5.7 (2.2)	0.0 (0.0)	0.0 (0.0)	0.0 (0.0)	0.0 (0.0)	0.0 (0.0)	0.4 (0.2)	7.8 (3.1)	22.6 (8.9)	101.2 (39.8)
Average precipitation days (≥ 1.0 mm)	11.1	8.9	10.6	12.8	13.1	15.3	15.3	12.7	10.6	9.9	11.2	11.3	140.8
Average relative humidity (%) (at 14:00)	76.6	72.9	62.3	57.9	57.3	59.5	59.6	62.1	65.6	73.6	76.1	77.3	66.7
Mean monthly sunshine hours	58.4	82.2	118.5	156.4	206.6	195.4	226.3	223.1	155.9	104.3	59.8	43.5	1,630.4
Percentage possible sunshine	30.0	30.1	33.9	41.1	47.8	44.8	51.5	54.9	44.9	35.6	25.1	22.1	38.5
Source: Central Institute for Meteorology and Geodynamics

== Transport ==
There are three railway stations within the municipality. Bregenz railway station is an intermediate stop on the Vorarlberg railway line (Vorarlbergbahn), which traverses Vorarlberg in a north-south direction. Another railway station on the same railway line is Bregenz Hafen railway station, which is situated adjacent to the harbour of Bregenz. A third station, Bregenz Riedenburg is situated further south on the Vorarlberg line. Bregenz station is called at by the S1 and S3 regional train services of Vorarlberg S-Bahn, S7 service of St. Gallen S-Bahn, REX 1 and long-distance EuroCity and Railjet trains, while the other two stations are only served by regional trains (S1, S3, REX 1). The regional train services are also part of Bodensee S-Bahn.

Lake Constance passenger boat cruises of the Vorarlberg Lines depart from Bregenz Harbour.

The Pfänderbahn is an aerial tram to Pfänder mountain, with its valley station located in Bregenz.

The city does not have its own airport: The nearest airports are:

- St. Gallen–Altenrhein Airport, located 23 km (14 mi) west.
- Friedrichshafen Airport, located 35 km (22 mi) north west.
- Zurich Airport, located 120 km (75 mi) west.

Bregenz is located on the Rheintal/Walgau motorway (A14).

== Sport ==
- A1 Bregenz HB is a handball team.
- SC Bregenz is the football team of the town, competing in the Austrian Regional League (Third Division).

== Notable people ==
=== Public service & commerce ===
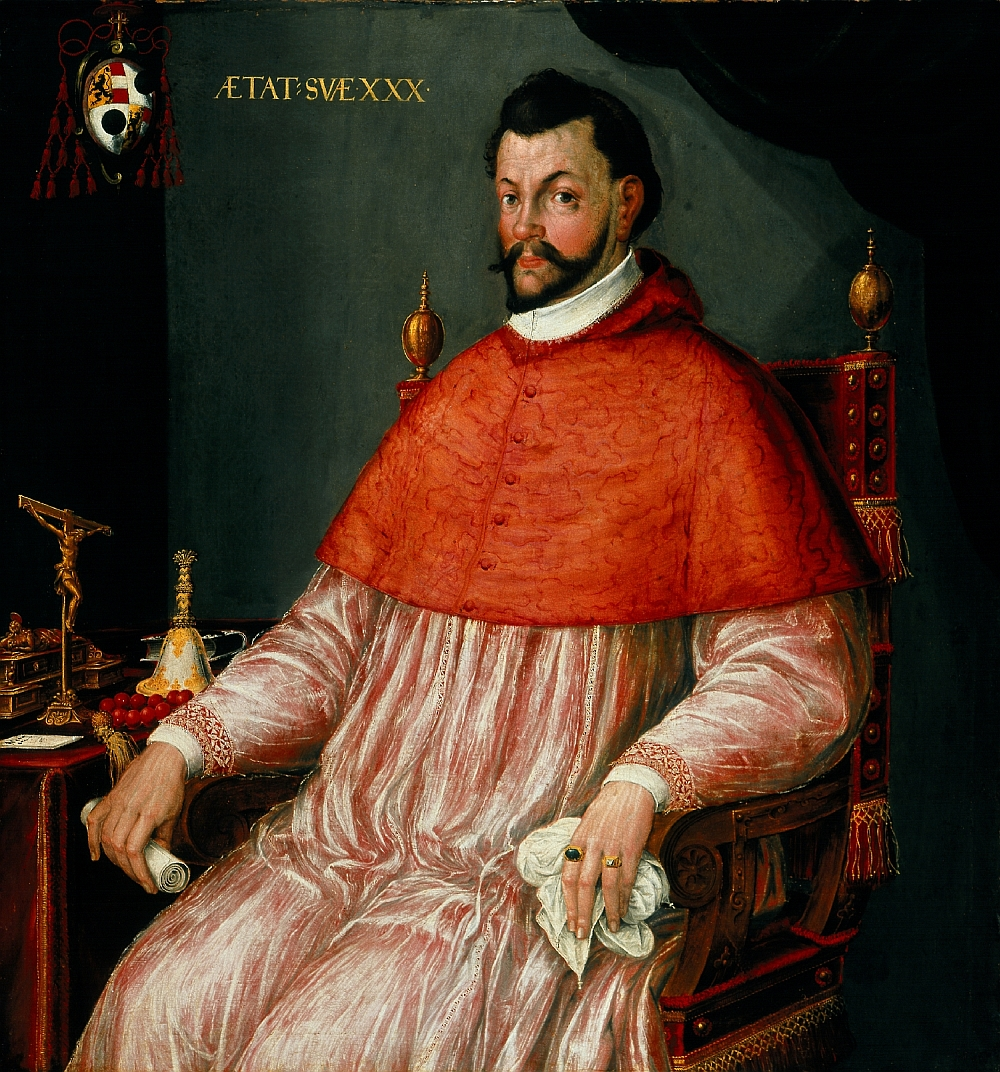
Wolf Dietrich von Raitenau, 1589

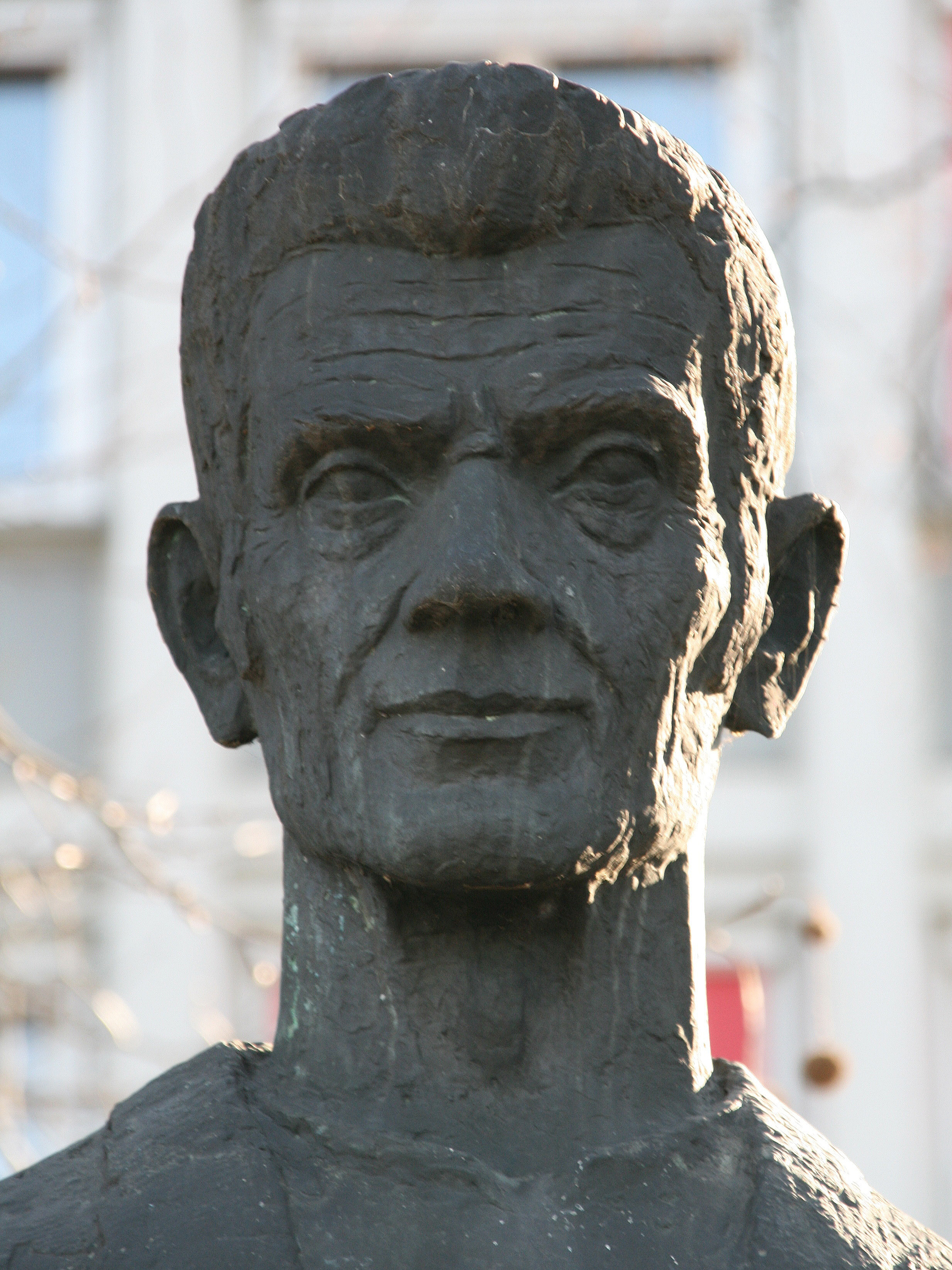
Statue of Jodok Fink, 2008

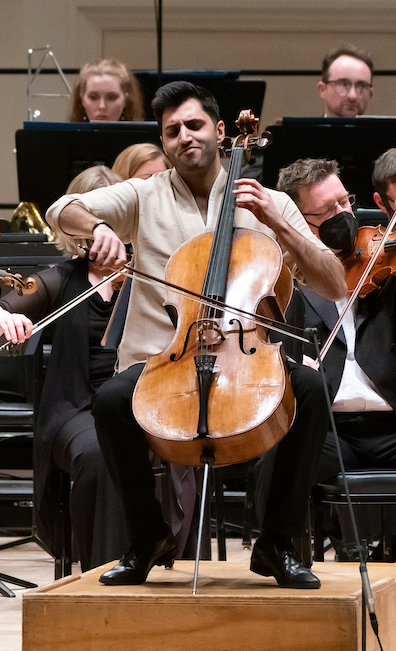
Kian Soltani, 2022

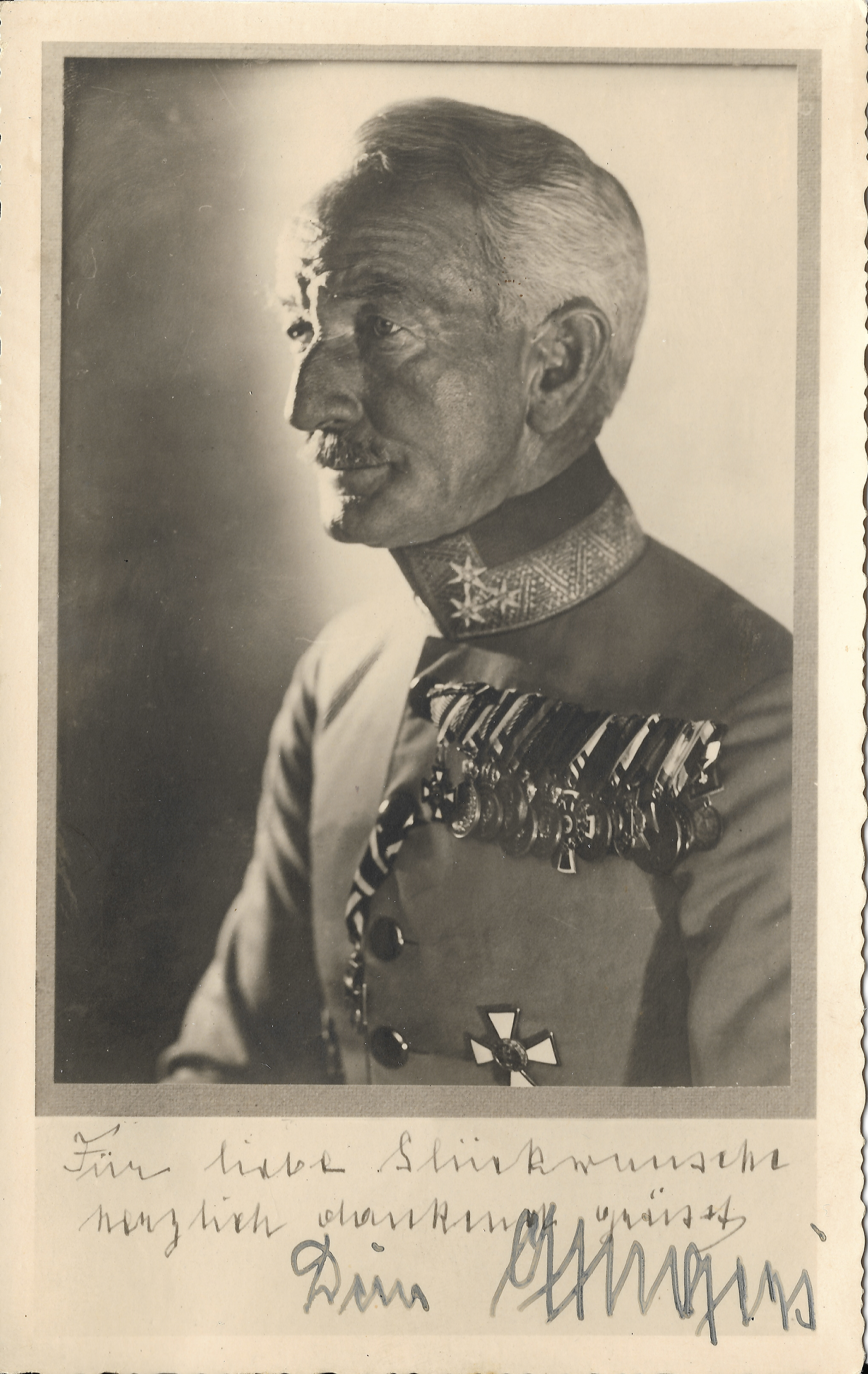
Postcard of Georg Bilgeri, 1927

- Wolf Dietrich von Raitenau (1559 in Lochau – 1617), Prince-Archbishop of Salzburg, 1587/1612
- Josef Fessler (1813 in Lochau – 1872), Roman Catholic Bishop of Sankt Pölten.
- Victor von Ebner (1842 – 1925), Austrian anatomist and histologist
- Johann Georg Hagen (1847–1930), Jesuit priest and astronomer
- Jodok Fink (1853 in Andelsbuch – 1929), farmer and politician, first Vice-Chancellor of Austria, 1919 to 1920.
- Valentin Feurstein (1885–1970), Austrian general in the Wehrmacht during World War II.
- Lorenz Bohler (1885 in Wolfurt – 1973), surgeon, an innovator of accident surgery, Nazi
- Maria Stromberger (1898 in Metnitz–1957), nurse, supported the inmates at Auschwitz, lived and died locally
- Irmfried Eberl (1910–1948), psychiatrist and commander of Treblinka extermination camp
- Hermann Gmeiner (1919 in Alberschwende – 1986), philanthropist and founder of SOS Children's Villages
- Fritz Mayer (DE Wiki) (1933–1988), politician, mayor of Bregenz, 1970 to 1988
- Hildegard Breiner (born 1936), anti-nuclear and environmental activist
- Herbert Sausgruber (born 1946 in Bludenz), governor of Vorarlberg, 1997-2011
- İlber Ortaylı (1947-2026), Turkish historian and professor of history
- Günter Bischof (born 1953 in Mellau), Austrian-American historian and university professor
- Ernst Fehr (born 1956 in Hard), Austrian behavioral economist and neuroeconomist
- Anton Amann (1956 – 2015), Austrian chemist and professor of chemistry at the Innsbruck Medical University
- Hans-Peter Martin (born 1957), journalist and politician, (SPOe), member of the European Parliament
- Hanni Rützler (born 1962), nutritional scientist, food trends researcher, author and health psychologist.

=== The Arts ===
- Johann Conrad Dorner (1810 in Egg – 1866), Austrian painter
- Kaspar Albrecht (1889 in Au – 1970), architect and sculptor
- Karl Michael Vogler (1928 in Remscheid – 2009), actor, raised in Bregenz
- Sieghardt Rupp (1931–2015), actor in films, television and theatre.
- Martin Pasi (born 1953), organ builder
- Robert Schneider (born 1961), writer of novels and poetry
- Stefan Sagmeister (born 1962), graphic designer, storyteller, and typographer
- Markus Gasser (born 1967), literary scientist and author
- Arno Geiger (born 1968 in Wolfurt), Austrian novelist
- Roman Rafreider (born 1969), Austrian television host and journalist
- Christof Unterberger (born 1970), cellist and film composer
- Maria Anwander (born 1980), conceptual artist, performance and installation art
- Lukas Birk (born 1982), photographer
- Kian Soltani (born 1992), principal cellist in Daniel Barenboim's West-Eastern Divan Orchestra
- Jakob Kasimir Hellrigl (born 1992), known as Candy Ken, rapper

=== Sport ===
- Georg Bilgeri (1873–1934), Austro–Hungarian Army officer, mountaineer, and Austrian pioneer of skiing.
- Max Sick (1882–1961), German strongman and gymnast, performed as Maxick.
- Patrick Ortlieb (born 1967), former World Cup alpine ski racer and gold medalist at the 1992 Winter Olympics
- Aleksandar Đorđević (born 1981), an Austrian footballer with over 300 club caps
- Lucas Mayer (born 1983), an Austrian former handball player, who played 78 games for Austria
- Robert Weber (born 1985), handball player with 213 caps for Austria, the third highest
- Philipp Netzer (born 1985), an Austrian football coach and former player who played 394 games.
- Dario Baldauf (born 1985), an Austrian footballer who has played over 320 games
- Martin Kobras (born 1986), an Austrian football goalkeeper, played 341 games for SC Rheindorf Altach
- Lukas Katnik (born 1989), an Austrian footballer who had played over 310 games
- Manuel Sutter (born in 1991), an Austrian footballer who has played over 330 games
- Barbara Gasser (born in 1989), an Austrian gymnast who represented Austria in London 2012 Olympics

== Twin towns ==
Bregenz is twinned with:

- (United Kingdom) Bangor, Northern Ireland – various exchange trips take place between the two places.
- Acre, Israel
