= Johann Conrad Dorner =

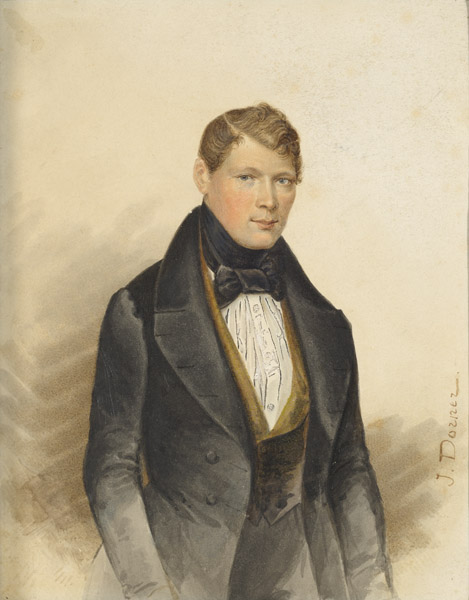
Self-portrait

Johann Conrad Dorner (15 August 1809 – 30 June 1866) was a painter from the Austrian Empire.

== Biography ==
Born at Egg, near Bregenz, in 1810, and studied historical painting under Cornelius. In 1836 he went to St. Petersburg, and there painted many portraits and altarpieces. He afterwards returned to Munich, and in 1860 went to Rome, where he died in 1866.

He executed his best works whilst in the Italian city, mostly of religious character. A Madonna and Child, with St. John and an Infant Christ are in the Pinakothek at Munich.
