= Roman Theatre (Bregenz) =

Ancient Roman amphitheater in Bregenz, Austria

Coordinates: 47.500461°N 9.747879°E

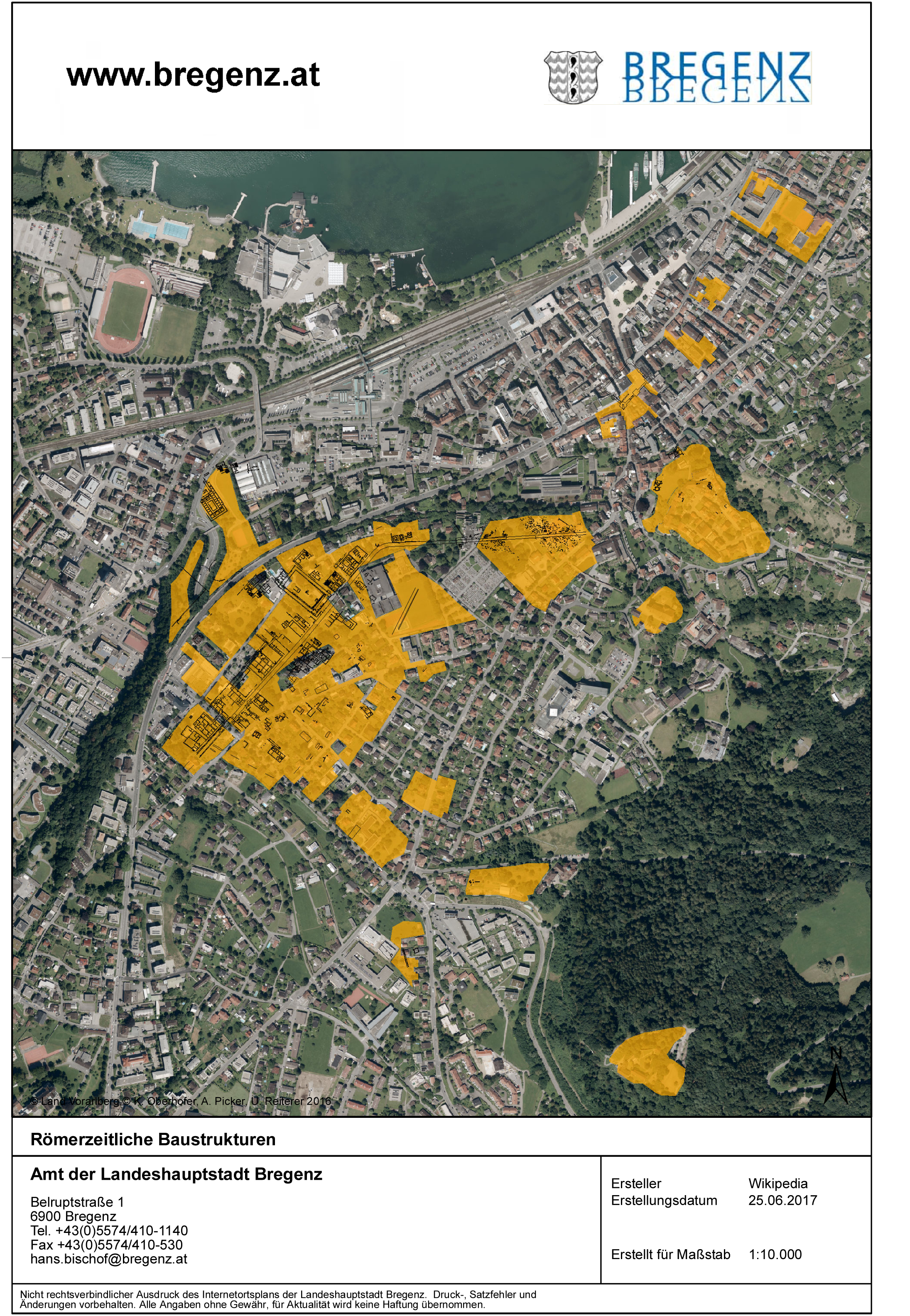
Bregenz (yellow) in Roman times

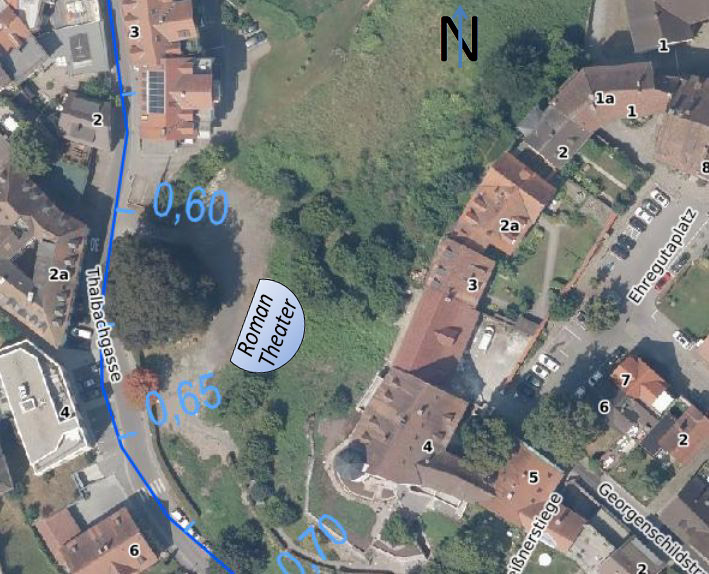
Location of the Roman Theater in Bregenz

The Roman Theatre in Bregenz, Vorarlberg, Austria, is located in the quarter of Thalbach in Bregenz. Bregenz was called Brigantium by the Romans. The theatre was excavated by archaeologists specifically in 2013 and 2019 in the name of the Vorarlberg provincial museum (German: vorarlberg museum, former: Vorarlberger Landesmuseum).

== Location ==
The Roman Theatre is located in the Thalbach lane (German: Thalbachgasse) at approx 408 masl, about 30 metres (98 ft) east behind the copper beech (Fagus sylvatica), a natural monument In Roman times the Thalbach – Bach in German is a brook – could be openly seen and formed a natural border to the area surrounding the theatre. Nowadays, the Thalbach runs through pipes here.

The Deuringschlössle, or "petite Deuring castle", in the upper part of Bregenz town (in German Bregenzer Oberstadt) is situated above the theatre at approx 35 metres (115 ft) to the east. The linear distance to the Kapuzinerkloster, a Capuchin monastery, is about 130 metres (430 ft) to the southwest, and circa 250 metres (820 ft) southeast to the Kloster Thalbach, or Thalbach Monastery.

== History ==
The importance of Roman Brigantium is mostly due to its favourable situation at Lake Constance referring to the traffic then. Another benefit of the location was the visible mouth of the local river called Bregenzer Ach, as well as the defile or the Klause (a choke point) which was strategically significant. Today, this area belongs to the municipality of Lochau. As a geographical advantage the local mountain range Pfänderstock in addition provided for a protective shield.

For many decades it was suspected that a Roman Theatre had existed in this area. Yet it was not until the years 2013 respectively 2019 that evidence was found to confirm these assumptions.

Until now there is not much knowledge available on the specific function or use of the Roman Theatre in Bregenz. Most probably the theatre of the Roman era featuring a stage (in German: römisches Bühnentheater) was used for civic and commemorative events, sacred ceremonies etc., as was the case in any other theatre of that time.

== Buildings ==
The Roman Theatre was built for an audience of more than 2000 visitors. This is by far more than what was needed for the population of Bregenz at the time of the Roman Empire. It can be concluded that this venue had a significance that was far greater than its boundaries. In comparison, the Roman Theatre of Mayence (German: Mainz), known as the largest theatre featuring a stage north of the Alps, could hold about 10,000 spectators.

Its base was made of stones that were mostly found in a brook, called Bachbölla in the local dialect of Vorarlberg. These stones originate in this region and come in an already rounded form. Other than that the building was a wooden construction. Its circumference apparently amounted to more than 50 metres (160 ft).

The area for the spectators, in Latin called cavea, or cavity (in German (Aus-)Höhlung), consisted of rising tiers in the shape of semi-circles. They were provided with at least two entrance facilities called vomitoria (singular vomitorium, from the Latin word vomere, which means to expectorate, in German: ausspeien, Engl.: spewed), because when seen from the stage the moving masses of spectators must have appeared like being spewed from the vomitoria. It is assumed that the different sectors for visitors in Bregenz were separated by corridors from each other, which was also encountered in other theatres of this type. In Latin this was called cunei (singular cuneus, which means wedge‚ in German Keil). So far there has been no investigation on the possible existence of a roofed gallery at the top end of the auditorium or eventually of a wooden arcade called porticus. It is confirmed that in other theatres awnings, in Latin velarium, were used. To attach these on the outer wall would have surely required several anchor points on the gallery level.

Seats in the theatre were allotted according to the position of the visitor in politics or the importance of his profession, ergo his social status. This is still valid today, as can be seen at Bregenz Festival (in German: Bregenzer Festspiele). Senators or members of the government in high positions were either seated in the orchestra, the space of semi-circles on the ground level found directly in front of the stage, or the tribunalia, which were theatre loges in an elevated position provided for at the sides of the cavea. So far no examination has been conducted on the assumption of a special entrance or aditus maximi for those persons.

== Similar constructions ==
- Roman Theatre of Mérida in Spain,
- Roman Theatre of Orange in France,
- Roman Theatre of Aspendos in Turkey,
- Roman Amphitheatre of Caesarea in Israel,
- Theatre of Marcellus in Rome.

== Social status of the actors ==
Referring to their social status, actors were seen at the bottom of society, apart from the fame of some very few. It was comparable to that of prostitutes or innkeepers. Assumingly in Bregenz of that time, actors were mainly citizens of foreign towns, slaves, or freedmen and women, etc. This situation was encountered throughout the whole Roman Empire. In Latin, these kind of people were called hostes or peregrini ("citizens of foreign towns"), servi respectively mancipia (slaves) or liberti respectively libertini (freedmen or women). Very seldom they were granted the Roman citizenship.

The Stoic Lucius Annaeus Seneca, also called Seneca the Younger, probably born around year 1 and deceased in 65 AD, was a philosopher, playwright, nature scientist and politician then. He labelled actors in the times of the Roman Empire to be proud and venturous heroes on the stage, yet starvelings in reality. They were also thought to be dishonest persons and thus discriminated in various ways. As a consequence, the lex de adulteriis coërcendis to name just one example, permitted a husband to kill an actor if he had seduced his spouse. Such a negative perception of actors as well as the worsened legal conditions for them was maintained over many centuries up until our most recent modern times in Europe.
