= Bregenzer Frühling =

Dance festival in Bregenz, Austria

Bregenz Spring Bregenzer Frühling
- Status: active
- Genre: dance festival
- Locations: Bregenz, Vorarlberg
- Country: Austria
- Inaugurated: 1987
- Previous event: 2023
- Next event: 2024
- Website: https://www.bregenzerfruehling.com/

The Bregenzer Frühling (Bregenzer Spring) is a dance festival in Bregenz, Vorarlberg (Austria). It has been held every year between March and June in the Festival Hall of Bregenz (Festspielhaus) since 1987.

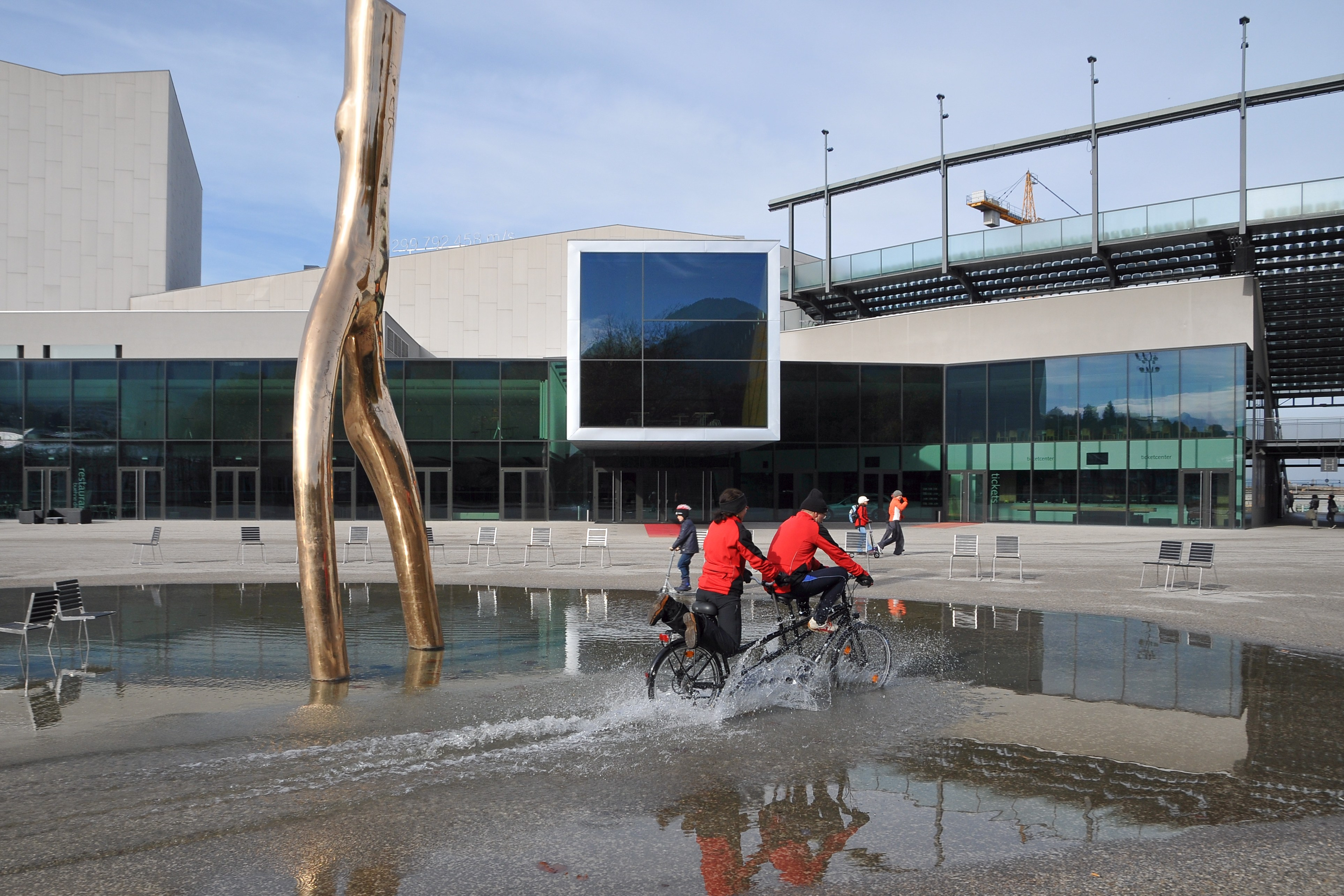
The Festspielhaus in Bregenz is one of the locations of the Bregenzer Frühling festival

Dance ensembles from all over the world perform their new productions, along with Austrian premieres. Each year, five different dance ensembles perform at the Bregenzer Frühling. With a budget of around EUR 500,000 and up to 10,000 visitors, Bregenzer Spring is one of the most important dance festivals in Austria.

The 2020 edition of the Bregenz Frühling had to be cancelled due to the COVID-19 pandemic.
