= Elizabeth Zharoff =

American opera singer and YouTuber (born 1986)

- Born: March 19, 1986 (age 40); Wenatchee, Washington, U.S.
- Occupations: Opera singer, YouTuber, vocal researcher, vocal coach
- Children: 2

YouTube information
- Channel: The Charismatic Voice
- Years active: 2014–present
- Genres: Vocal analysis; Reaction video; interview
- Subscribers: 2.2 million
- Views: 569.2 million
- Last updated: August 16, 2026
- Website: thecharismaticvoice.com

Elizabeth McCune (née Ford; born March 19, 1986), known professionally as Elizabeth Zharoff, is an American YouTuber, video game sound designer, and opera singer. After largely putting her operatic career on hold, she devoted herself to the topics of voice and singing on her YouTube channel, "The Charismatic Voice". She primarily works as a voice coach and singer and arranger of video game soundtracks. She also interviews rock vocalists. Her YouTube channel, as of August 2026, had over 569 million views and over 2.2 million subscribers.

== Early life and education ==
Elizabeth Zharoff grew up in Wenatchee, Washington, where she attended Wenatchee High School. After high school, she spent a year in France before enrolling at Pacific Lutheran University in 2005. In 2007 she transferred to the Oberlin Conservatory of Music in Oberlin, Ohio, from which she earned a bachelor's degree in vocal performance in 2009. While still a student at Oberlin Conservatory of Music, Zharoff took part in several prestigious music competitions and made her debut as a soloist at Carnegie Hall in 2009. In the same year she reached the semi-finals of the Metropolitan Opera National Council Auditions and, two years later, reached the final of the Queen Elisabeth Competition. In 2012 she completed a master's degree in opera singing from the Curtis Institute of Music in Philadelphia.

== Career ==
=== Opera ===
After initial engagements at the Opera Philadelphia, Zharoff was a member of the Young Ensemble of the Dresden Semperoper in the 2012/13 season, where she sang Pamina in Mozart's The Magic Flute and Violetta in Verdi's La traviata. In addition to embodying other soprano roles at various opera houses, she appeared on the concert stage with the Cleveland Orchestra and performed a chamber piece composed for her by Richard Danielpour. In the 2013/14 season she made her debut as Giunia in Lucio Silla at the Opéra National de Bordeaux.

Ingrid Gerk praised Zharoff's performance in an otherwise disappointing production of La traviata at the English National Opera in 2015:

Elizabeth Zharoff was the most convincing. Even if the voice in the forte sounded rather harsh, the height was occasionally a nuance too low and a superficially (visible and) audible vibrato somewhat diminished the overall impression in the close-up, over the course of the performance she showed stamina and concentration and was touching her beautiful soulful piano passages."

She said of her performance of Violetta in La traviata:

This production is tough because there's no intermission. Vocally I don't know if it's that big a difference for me, but emotionally and keeping focus – that's difficult. Being willing to be vulnerable for that long makes Violetta a lot more personal to me. It's almost depressing to be in her state. I'm not the kind of singer who acts from the outside; I do my best to put myself in her position and draw on my own life experiences to make it real. By the end I'm all done and I say 'Jeez, I'm glad she's dead so I can leave all that behind‘.

=== YouTube ===
In August 2014, Zharoff launched her own YouTube channel, "The Charismatic Voice," with the motto "Demystifying singing," in which she addresses many facets of the human voice and singing via reaction videos. After the number of subscribers grew sharply during the first year of the COVID pandemic, she hired an assistant in the summer of 2020. In her reaction videos, she analyzes and comments on different vocal aspects. At the suggestion of her subscribers, she began to devote her analysis to rock and metal singers, whom she had never heard, such as Ronnie James Dio and Rob Halford and, increasingly, to extreme, guttural vocals, featuring subgenres such as deathcore. In January 2021, she also began to conduct long-distance video "tea-time interviews" with well-known singers. Early guests included Alissa White-Gluz, James LaBrie, Will Ramos, and Devin Townsend.

=== Video games ===
Zharoff arranges vocal parts for video games of various genres, including the real-time strategy game 0 AD and the point-and-click adventure game Elsinore, released in 2019 and which was nominated for "Best Original Choral Composition," "Best Original Song" with "Fair as a Rose," and "Best Original Soundtrack Album" at the 18th Annual Game Audio Network Guild Awards.

Zharoff performs as Annette in the role-playing musical game People of Note.

=== Vocal coaching and research ===
Zharoff offers online courses as a voice coach. She has also developed an interest in sound creation within the upper laryngeal structure. She used a Kickstarter campaign in September 2024 to create The Charismatic Voice Research Fund, which will allow university studies of this largely not-widely-understood function, using professional singers as test subjects. The best known of these subjects is Will Ramos. The campaign was promoted through her YouTube channel and a feature interview with CanvasRebel Magazine. Within a month of its launch, the campaign had surpassed its goal of USD$235,000.

== Personal life ==
Zharoff is married and lives in Tucson, Arizona with her husband, Kirk McCune, and their sons. The couple's second son was born on April 19, 2025.

== Opera repertoire ==
- Samuel Barber: Antony and Cleopatra – Cleopatra
- Vincenzo Bellini: La sonnambula – Amina
- Charles Gounod: Faust – Marguerite
- Leoš Janáček: The sly little vixen – Sly little vixen
- Claudio Monteverdi: L'incoronazione di Poppea – Drusilla
- Wolfgang Amadeus Mozart: The Abduction from the Seraglio – Konstanze
- Wolfgang Amadeus Mozart: The Magic Flute – Pamina
- Wolfgang Amadeus Mozart: Lucio Silla – Giunia
- Igor Stravinsky: The Rake's Progress – Anne Trulove
- Giuseppe Verdi: La traviata – Violetta
- Kurt Weill: Street Scene – Anna Maurrant

== Ludography ==
=== Original soundtracks ===
- 2017: Aven Colony
- 2018: Where the Water Tastes Like Wine
- 2018: Yoku's Island Express
- 2018: 0 AD
- 2019: Devolver Digital Cinematic Universe: Phase 1 Original Soundtrack
- 2019: Elsinore
- 2020: Lost Words: Beyond the Page
- 2021: Ambition: A Minuet in Power

=== Compilations ===
- 2016: Successor: Final Fantasy VIII Remixed
- 2016: Mobius: Sonic the Hedgehog Remixed
- 2016: Pattern: An Homage to Everybody's Gone to the Rapture
- 2016: Enraptured: BioShock Remixed
- 2016: Fallen: An Undertale Tribute
- 2016: Song Cycle: The History of Video Games
- 2017: Zodiac: Final Fantasy Tactics Remixed
- 2017: Tesseract: An Acoustic FEZ Album
- 2017: Spira: Music from Final Fantasy X (Besaid Mix)
- 2018: Fate: A Tribute to Majora's Mask
- 2019: Exile: A Tribute to Supergiant Games
- 2019: Resurrection of the Night: Alucard's Elegy
- 2019: Epoch: A Tribute to Chrono Trigger
- 2020: Flamesgrace: A Tribute to Octopath Traveler
