= Wenatchee School District =

School district in Washington, United States

Coordinates: 47°25′40″N 120°19′34″W

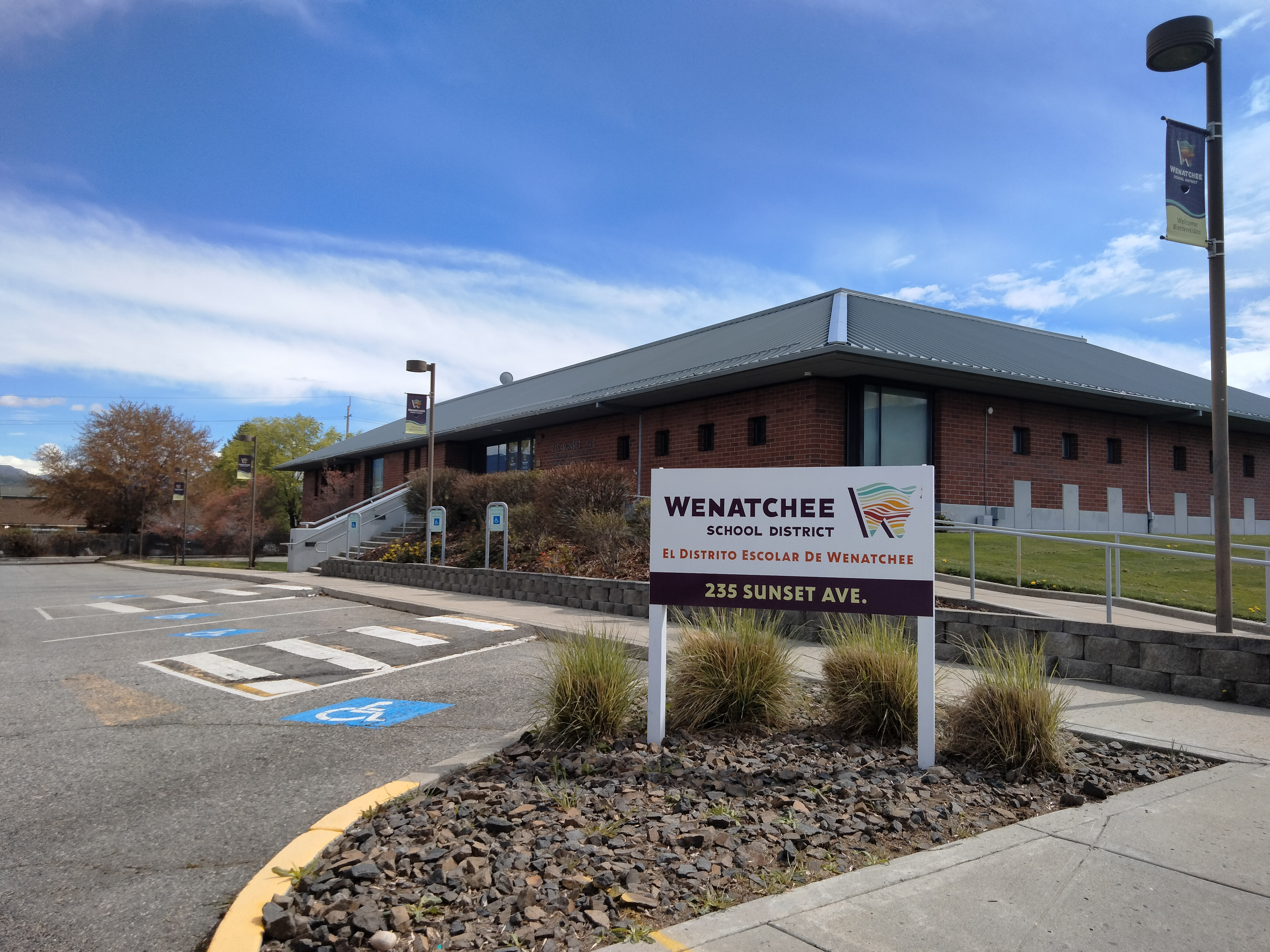

Wenatchee School District #246 is a public school district of the State of Washington serving the city of Wenatchee and surrounding communities. As of May 2016 the approximate student population of the district is 7,931, served by 467 teachers.

== Schools ==
School type	Name	Location
High School	Wenatchee High School (AAAA)	1101 Millerdale Ave.
High School	Westside High School (Alternative)	1510 Ninth Street
Middle School	Foothills Middle School	1410 Maple Street
Middle School	Orchard Middle School	1024 Orchard Ave.
Middle School	Pioneer Middle School	1620 Russel Street
Elementary School	Abraham Lincoln Elementary	1224 Methow Street
Elementary School	Columbia Elementary	600 Alaska Street
Elementary School	John Newbery Elementary School	850 North Western Ave.
Elementary School	Lewis and Clark Elementary	1130 Princeton Ave.
Elementary School	Mission View Elementary	60 Terminal Ave.
Elementary School	Sunnyslope Elementary	3109 School Street, Sunnyslope
Elementary School	Washington Elementary School	1401 Washington Street
A.E.P.	Valley Academy of Learning (Alternative Education Program)	1911 N Wenatchee Ave.
Internet	Wenatchee Internet Academy	Online
Technical Training	Wenatchee Valley Technical Skills Center	327 East Penney Road, Olds Station

== Demographics ==
Due to the location of Wenatchee, the city hosts a large minority population. Approximately 30% of students are Hispanic, 1.3% are Asian, .5% are African American, and the remaining are either Caucasian or Native American. The large percentage of Hispanic students comes from the number of Hispanics that migrate to and from Wenatchee and surrounding communities to work in the local fruit industry.

== See also ==
- Wenatchee, Washington
- Sunnyslope, Washington
- Malaga, Washington
