= Nagelfluhkette =

Mountain range in Bavaria, Germany and Vorarlberg, Austria

Coordinates: 47°30′10″N 10°06′20″E

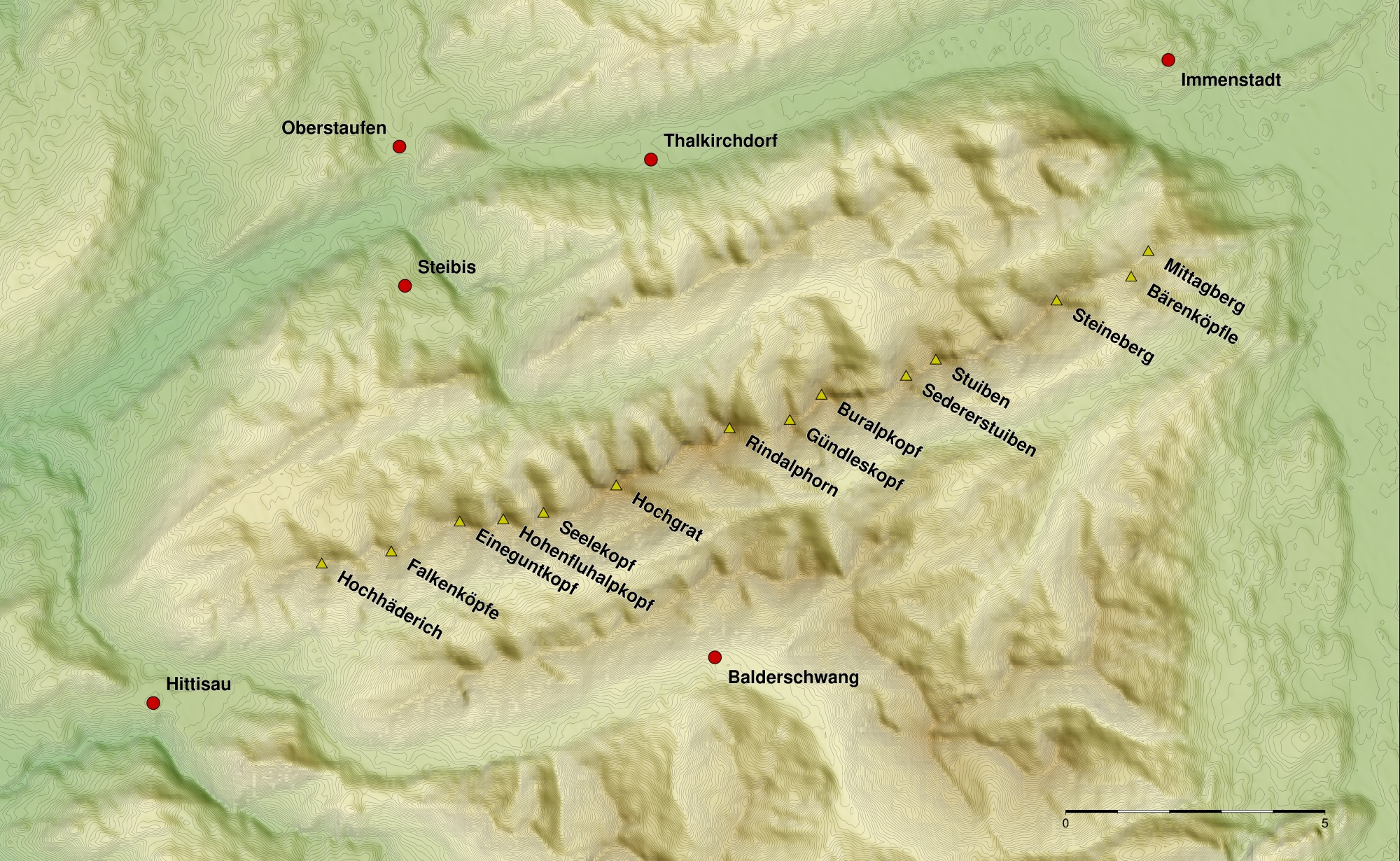
Map of the Nagelfluhkette

The Nagelfluhkette is a mountain range located in Bavaria, Germany and Vorarlberg, Austria, bordering on the northern edge of the Allgäu Alps. It has a maximum altitude of 1,834 m above sea level. Its name derives from the rock type Nagelfluh. In older and geological literature, as well as in the local vernacular language, one also finds the term Hochgratkette.

The geotope Nagelfluhkette is the most extensive object of the Nagelfluhkette Nature Park, which was established on 1 January 2008.

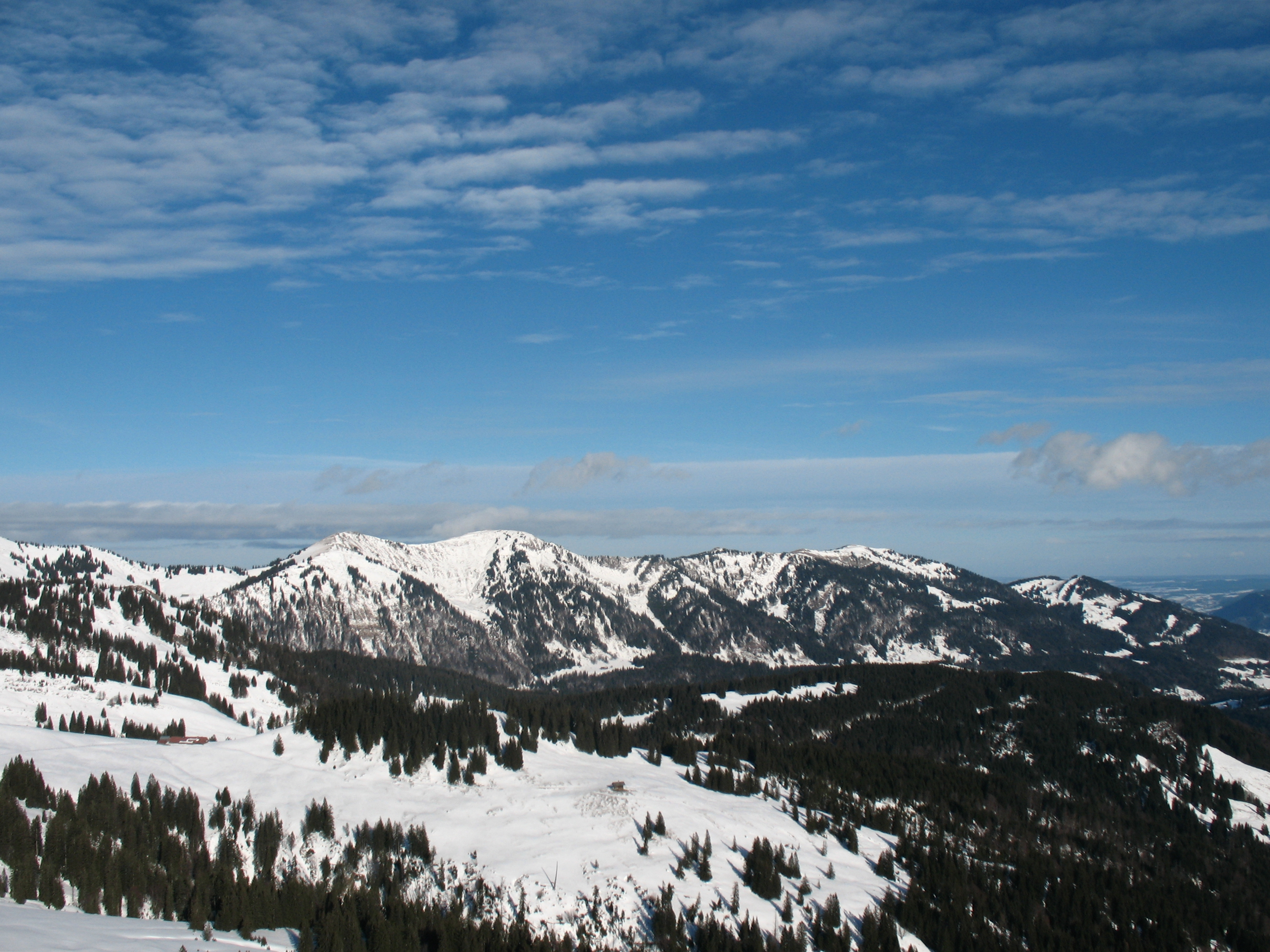
Eastern Nagelfluhkette: Sedererstuiben (1737 m), Stuiben (1749 m), Steineberg (1660 m) and Mittagberg (1451 m).

== Location ==
The Nagelfluhkette extends throughout the western part of the Allgäu Alps west of the Illertal, in which the Bavarian cities Sonthofen and Immenstadt lie. Between these cities is Blaichach, from where the mountain range stretches for about 20 km in west-southwest direction to the Vorarlberg community of Hittisau. The German-Austrian border runs along the saddle of the mountain ridge between Hohenfluhalpkopf and Hochhäderich (Hoher Häderich).

The Nagelfluhkette is one of the last higher elevations of the Alps before further north the Alpine foothills of the Allgäu begin. In the north lies the valley of the west-flowing Weißach; in the southeast the Hörnergruppe rises beyond the valley of the northeast-flowing Aubach.

== Nagelfluhkette Nature Park ==
The Nagelfluhkette Nature Park is the first cross-border nature park to be created between Germany and Austria, thus representing an international natural protection pilot project. It also constitutes the first natural park in the Bavarian Alps.

Priority objectives are the protection, care and development of nature and the diverse landscapes. Nature parks are relatively weak protection instruments, which primarily serve to harmonize the interests of nature conservation and local tourism. This part is located primarily in parts of the Bavarian Forest which are still in use, and not in the well-developed alpine area. In Vorarlberg – unlike in the other federal states of Austria – a nature park is not a legally protected area. The Nagefluhkette Nature Park is a voluntary commitment of the nature park communities themselves. Therefore, the park is (as of 5/2011) not a member of the Association of Nature Parks of Austria (VNÖ).

=== Size and participating communities ===
The Nagelfluhkette Nature Park covers 24,700 hectares in the district of Oberallgäu and 16,300 hectares in the adjacent Bregenzerwald, making a total of about 410 square kilometers. Six Oberallgäu communities and eight Vorarlberg communities joined forces for this project:

- Germany: Balderschwang, Blaichach, Bolsterlang, Fischen, Immenstadt, Oberstaufen, Obermaiselstein
- Austria: Doren, Hittisau, Krumbach, Langenegg, Lingenau, Riefensberg, Sibratsgfäll, Sulzberg

=== Administration ===
The nature park administration ("Naturpark Nagelfluhkette e.V.") is based in Bühl am Alpsee, a district of Immenstadt. On the Austrian side, the park is looked after in the community offices.

== Tourism ==
The Nagelfluhkette is flanked by lower mountain ridges to the north and south and thus offers excellent views in almost all directions. Mountain railways are operated all year round in Mittagberg (Mittagbahn) and Hochgrat (Hochgratbahn).

=== Hiking ===
Hikes on the Kammweg chain are of the most popular in the district of Oberallgäu, thanks to the glorious views. Since all mountains are individually accessible, there is a great variety of secure walks, with only a minimum of climbing obstacles. Some places, especially between Steineberg and Stuiben, and between Falken and Hochhädrich, are difficult and exposed, requiring a high degree of sure-footedness and a head for heights.

Shorter routes lead, for example, from the mountain station of the Mittagbahn over the Steineberg and Stuiben through the Steigbachtal back to Immenstadt. Another trail is the Maximiliansweg, which leads over the mountains Hochgrat, Rindalphorn, and Buralpkopf.

Well-secured and -signposted medium-length tours include the crossing of the entire eastern chain from Hochgrat to the Mittag (Nagelfluh-Gratwanderung), which follows the European long-distance hiking trails E4 and E5 at this stage, and the crossing of the western chain between Hochgrat and Falken (Luftiger Grat).

The Königstour, an entire crossing of the Nagelfluh from Mittagberg to Hochhädrich, is doable on a single day, provided the hiker is sportive and fit (length of the tour: about 8.5 hours, including breaks). In any case, the Staufner Haus of the German Alpine Club is available as an accommodation hut.

=== Winter sports ===
In addition to the mountain railways, there are ski lifts to the Einguntkopf (from Falkenhütte) and Hochhädrich, each on the snow-sure north side.

Slopes for skiers are located at Mittagberg, Hochgrat, Einguntkopf and Hochhädrich in Austria. Large parts of the Nagelfluh crossing are accessible as winter hikes with snowshoes or touring skis.

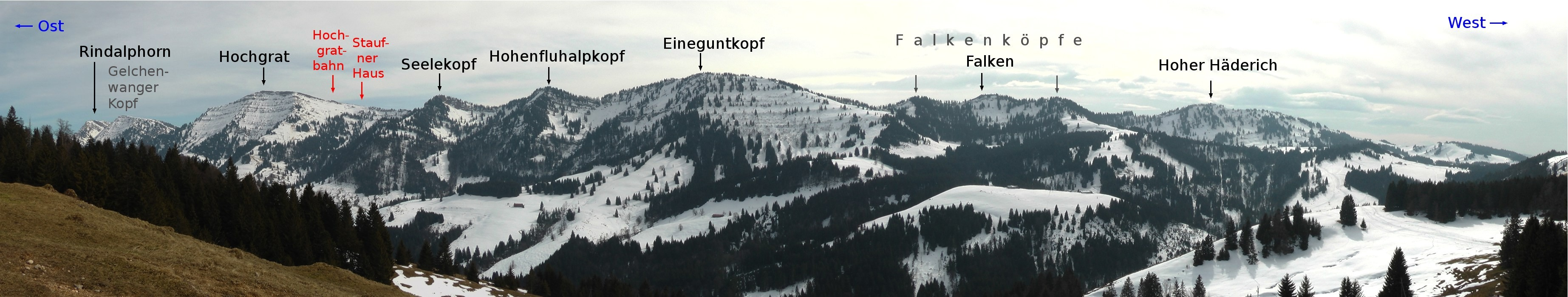
Panoramic view of the western Nagelfluhkette (from Imberg, Steibis)

== Mountains ==
The highest mountain of the Nagelfluhkette is the Hochgrat with a height of 1,834 m.

Name	Country	Height of peak	Distinctive features
Mittagberg (Mittag)	Germany	1,451 m	Double chair lift "Mittagbahn"
Bärenköpfle	Germany	1,463 m	
Steineberg	Germany	1,683 m	
Steinköpfle	Germany	1,669 m	
Stuiben	Germany	1,749 m	
Sedererstuiben	Germany	1,737 m	
Buralpkopf	Germany	1,772 m	
Gündleskopf	Germany	1,748 m	
Rindalphorn	Germany	1,822 m	
Gelchenwanger Kopf	Germany	1,805 m	
Hochgrat	Germany	1,834 m	Hochgratbahn, Staufner Haus
Seelekopf	Germany	1,663 m	
Hohenfluhalpkopf	Germany/Austria	1,636 m	
Eineguntkopf / Rohnehöhe	Germany/Austria	1,641 m	
Falken(köpfe)	Germany/Austria	1,564 m	Hut "Falkenhütte" (ca. 1450 m)
Hochhäderich (Hoher Häderich)	Germany/Austria	1,565 m	Drag lift
