= Nussbaumer (surname) =

Notable people with surname Nussbaumer, or Nußbaumer, include:

- Bob Nussbaumer (1924–1997), American football halfback
- Daniel Nussbaumer (born 1999), Austrian football player
- Henri Nussbaumer (born 1931), French engineer
- Horst Nußbaumer (born 1971), Austrian rower
- Ingo Nussbaumer (born 1956), Austrian artist and researcher
- Jamie Nussbaumer (born 1987), cricketer
- Lars Nussbaumer (born 2001), Austrian footballer
- Luke Nussbaumer (born 1989), professional cricketer
