= Sibratsgfäll =

- Municipality
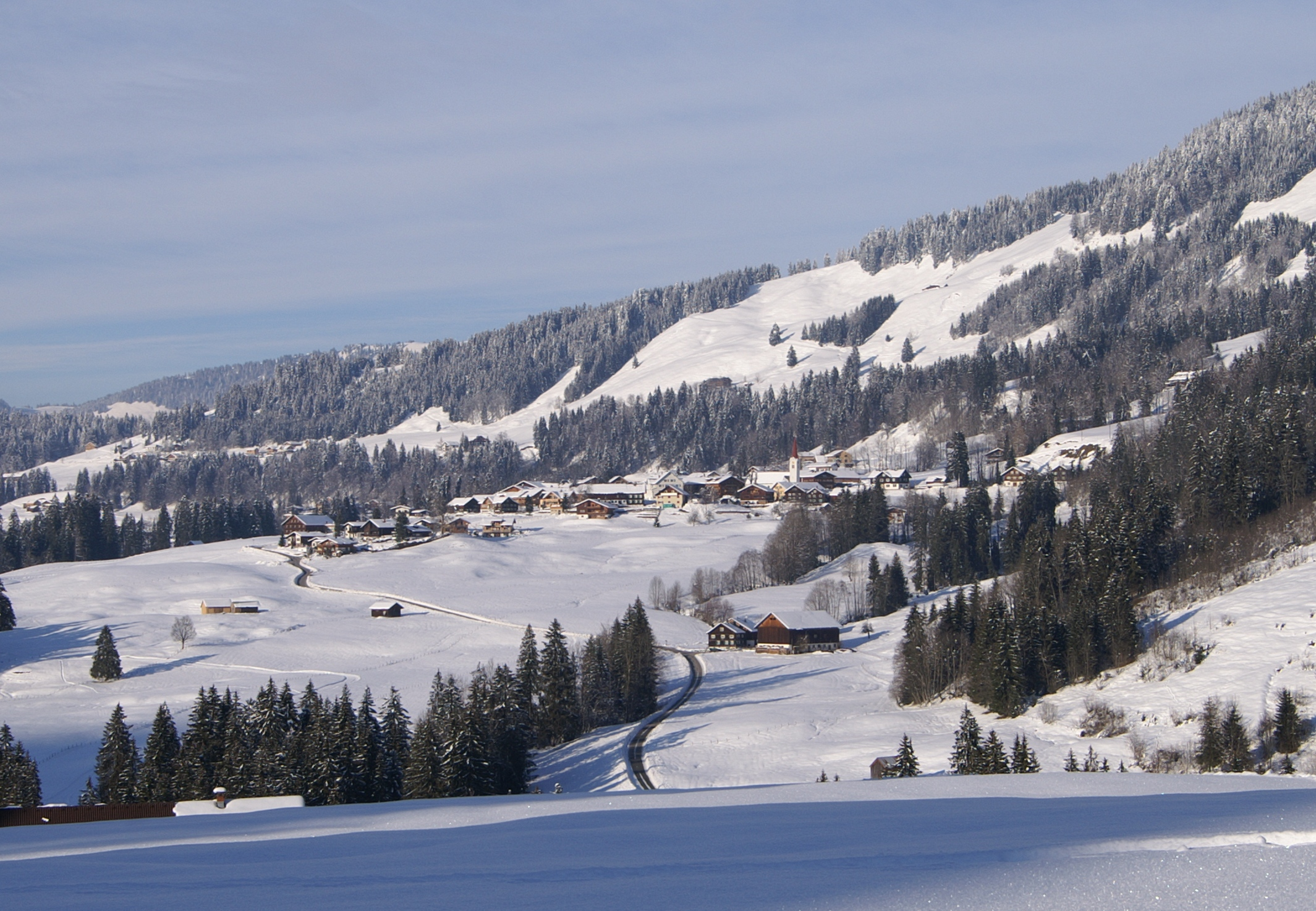

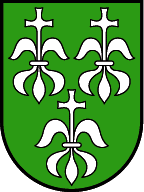
- Coat of arms

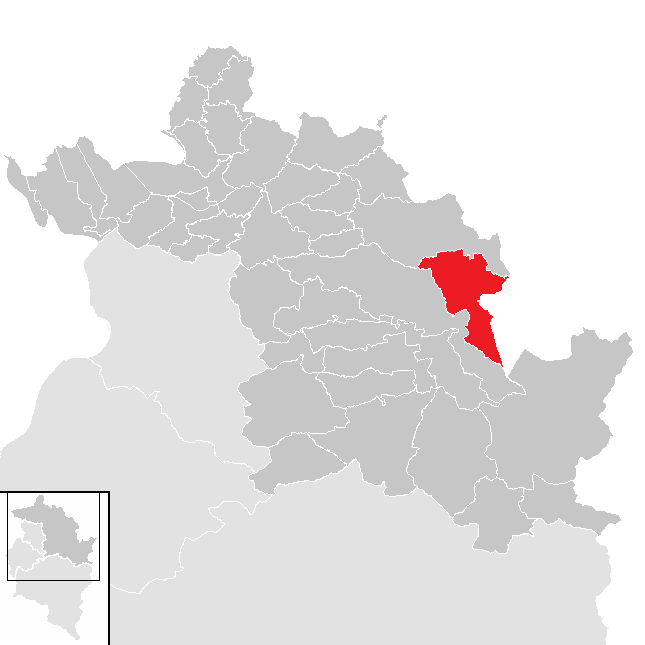
- Location in the district

- Location within Austria
- Coordinates: 47°25′36″N 10°02′17″E
- Country: Austria
- State: Vorarlberg
- District: Bregenz

Government
  - Mayor: Konrad Stadelmann

Area
  - Total: 29.2 km^{2} (11.3 sq mi)
- Elevation: 929 m (3,048 ft)

Population (2018-01-01)
  - Total: 401
  - Density: 13.7/km^{2} (35.6/sq mi)
- Time zone: UTC+1 (CET)
  - Summer (DST): UTC+2 (CEST)
- Postal code: 6952
- Area code: 05513
- Vehicle registration: B
- Website: www.sibra.at

Sibratsgfäll is a municipality in the district of Bregenz in the Austrian state of Vorarlberg.

== Geography ==
Sibratsgfäll is located in the westernmost province of Austria, Vorarlberg, in the district of Bregenz, east of Lake Constance, at an altitude of 929 meters. 46.0% of the area is forested, 34.2% mountainous (Alps). The community is located directly on the border with Germany. There are no other cadastral communities in Sibratsgfäll.

The community of Sibratsgfäll borders on two Austrian and two German communities: Hittisau and Egg in the Austrian district of Bregenz, and Balderschwang and Oberstdorf in the Bavarian district of Oberallgäu.

Sibratsgfäll is a member of the Austrian-German joint project Naturpark Nagelfluhkette.

== History ==
The Habsburgs ruled Vorarlberg's villages alternately from Tyrol and Vorderösterreich (Freiburg im Breisgau). From 1805 to 1814 Sibratsgfäll belonged to Bavaria, then reverted to Austria. Sibratsgfäll has belonged to the Austrian state of Vorarlberg since its founding in 1861. The village was part of the French occupation zone in Austria from 1945 to 1955.

=== Coat of arms ===
The coat of arms, inspired by a design by the Schruns artist and heraldist Konrad Honold, was created in 1969.

== Culture ==
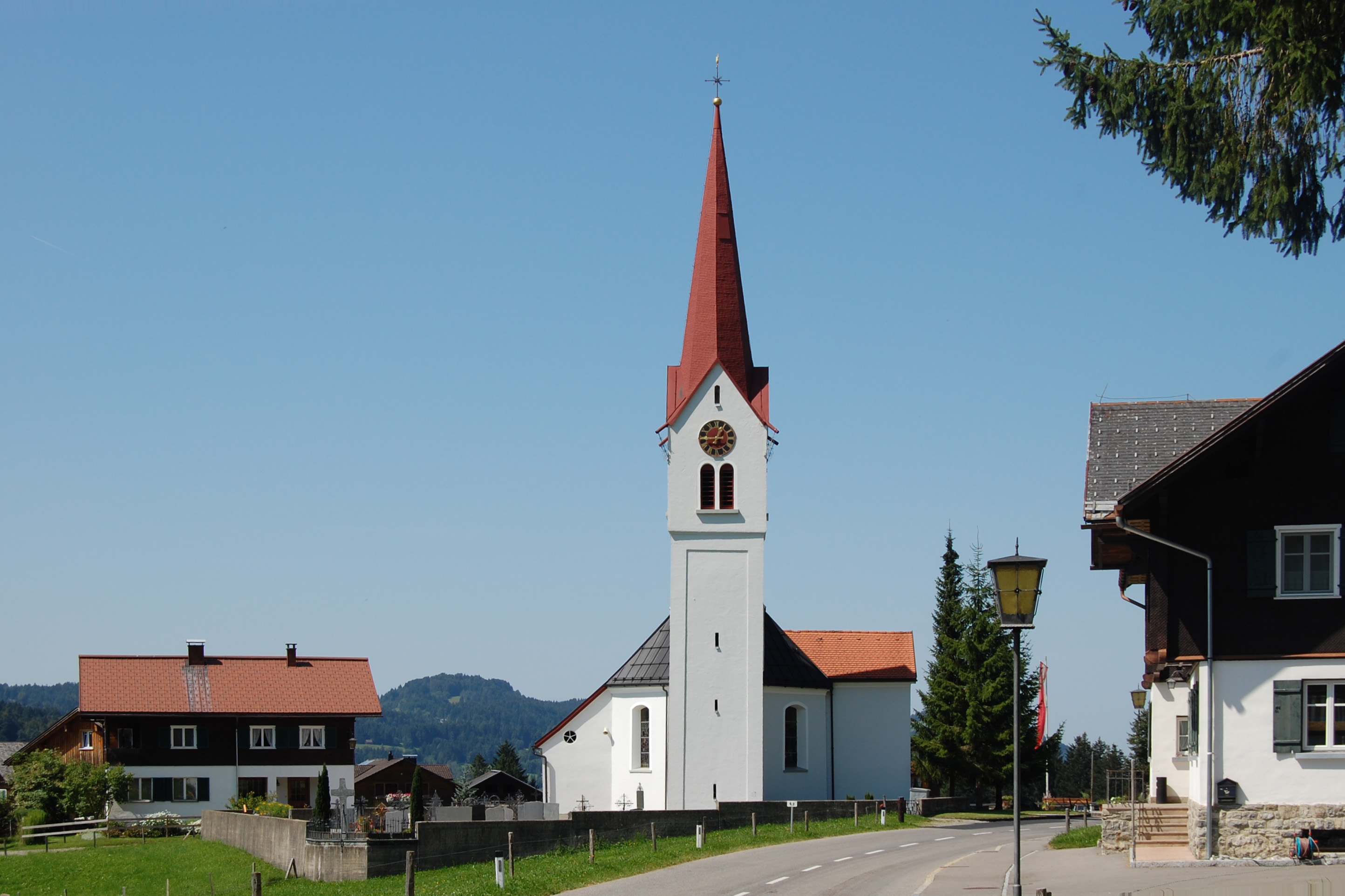
Parish church Sibratsgfäll (hl. Michael)

The Sibratsgfäll parish church is dedicated to the Archangel Michael and belongs to the deanery of Vorderwald-Kleinwalsertal. It was first mentioned, as a chapel, in a document from 1732. In 1805, a new church building was built, and later extended in 1845.

== Population ==
Historical population
Year	Pop.	±%
1869	304	—
1880	352	+15.8%
1890	289	−17.9%
1900	267	−7.6%
1910	284	+6.4%
1923	268	−5.6%
1934	270	+0.7%
1939	256	−5.2%
1951	340	+32.8%
1961	330	−2.9%
1971	308	−6.7%
1981	367	+19.2%
1991	404	+10.1%
2001	422	+4.5%
2011	393	−6.9%
