= Lanzenbach =

Lanzenbach may refer to:

- Lanzenbach (Bühler), a river of Baden-Württemberg, Germany, tributary of the Bühler
- Lanzenbach (Speltach), a river of Baden-Württemberg, Germany, tributary of the Speltach
- Lanzenbach (Weißach), a river of Bavaria, Germany, tributary of the Weißach
