= Lingenau =

- Municipality
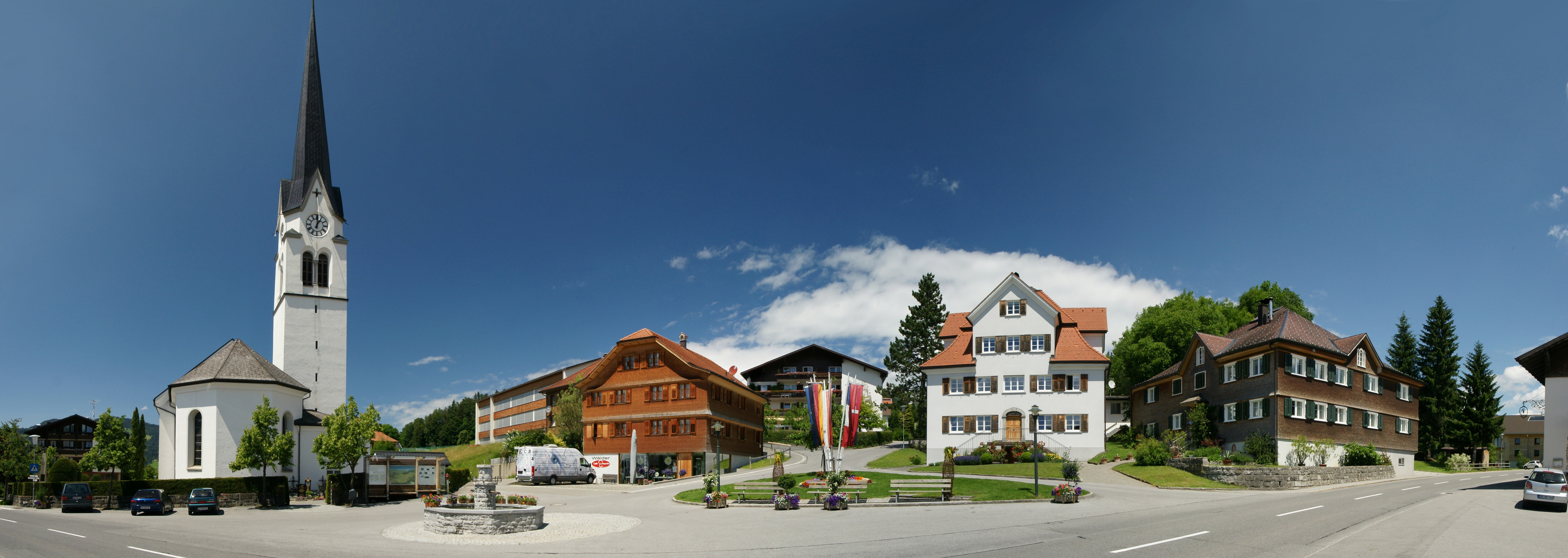

- Coat of arms

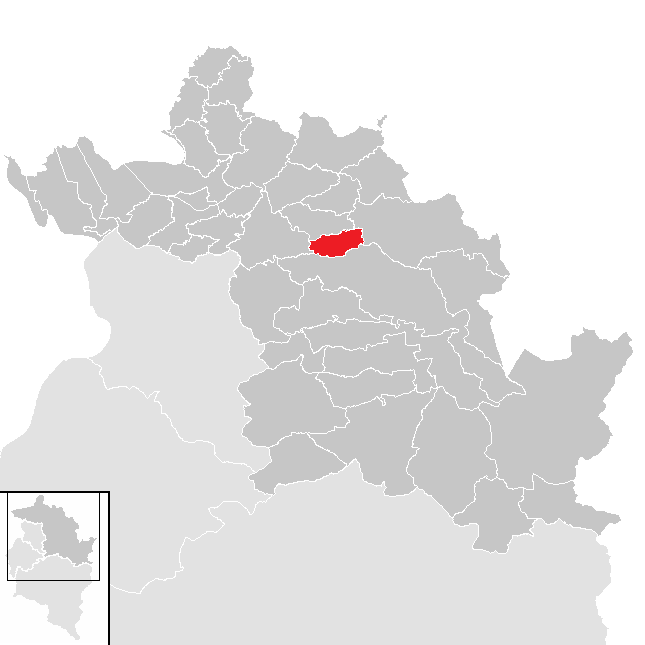
- Location in the district

- Location within Austria
- Coordinates: 47°27′00″N 09°55′12″E
- Country: Austria
- State: Vorarlberg
- District: Bregenz

Government
  - Mayor: Annette Sohler (ÖVP)

Area
  - Total: 6.89 km^{2} (2.66 sq mi)
- Elevation: 685 m (2,247 ft)

Population (2018-01-01)
  - Total: 1,466
  - Density: 213/km^{2} (551/sq mi)
- Time zone: UTC+1 (CET)
  - Summer (DST): UTC+2 (CEST)
- Postal code: 6951
- Area code: 05513
- Vehicle registration: B
- Website: www.lingenau.at

Lingenau is a municipality in the district of Bregenz, in the westernmost Austrian state of Vorarlberg.

== Geography ==
Lingenau is located southeast of Lake Constance, at an altitude of 685m. 30.8% of the area is wooded. There are no other cadastral communities in Lingenau. It is a member of the German-Austrian joint project Naturpark Nagelfluhkette.

The town of Lingenau borders on four other Vorarlberg communities: Langenegg, Hittisau, Egg and Alberschwende.

== History ==
"Lindigenowe" was first mentioned in documents in 1227. It is the oldest settlement of the Vorderwald (also known as Vorderer Bregenzerwald) and belonged to the monastery estate of Mehrerau for a long period of time.

The Habsburgs ruled parts of Vorarlberg alternately from Tyrol and Vorderösterreich (Freiburg im Breisgau). From 1805 to 1814, Lingenau belonged to Bavaria, then reverted to Austria. Since the formation of the Austrian state of Vorarlberg in 1861, Lingenau has belonged to Vorarlberg.

For centuries, up to the beginning of World War II, inhabitants benefitted from Bad Hohl, which is located at a ferruginous spring called Maxriese.

From 1945 to 1955, Lingenau was part of the French occupation zone in Austria.

== Culture ==
The parish church Hl. Johannes der Täufer ("St. John the Baptist") was built in the 19th century.

The Baroque Hl. Anna Chapel was built in 1722 and is made of tufa.

The tufa nature trail (Quelltuff-Naturlehrpfad) is located to a creek that has created over 40 vertical meters of massive Quelltuff (tufa).

The wooden Gschwendtobel bridge between Lingenau and Egg, over the river Subersach, was constructed in 1834 by Alois Negrelli, one of the main architects of the Suez Canal. Given its age, the bridge is considered to be a masterpiece of engineering and carpentry.

The suspension bridge between Lingenau and Egg (over the river Subersach), a steel wire footbridge, was constructed in 1901. The bridge has a length of 57 meters and is only suitable for walkers.

The Bregenzerwälder Käsekeller opened in Lingenau in 2002. More than 32,000 cheese wheels are stored for aging in this cheese cellar. It was an initiative of the Käsestraße Bregenzerwald, to preserve small-scale agriculture and the diversity of local products in the Bregenz Forest, and to support Vorarlberg's cheese culture. With more than 6.5 million euros, the cheese cellar was the largest investment ever made in the Vorarlberg dairy industry.

Lingenau is part of the Bregenzerwald Umgang (literally "Bregenzerwald Walking Tour"). This walking tour offers insights into the architecture and community planning of 12 traditional villages in the Bregenzerwald. While walking over various landscapes, visiting public buildings, homes and everyday objects, walkers gain a comprehensive overview of typical Bregenzerwald architectural styles as they developed throughout the ages.

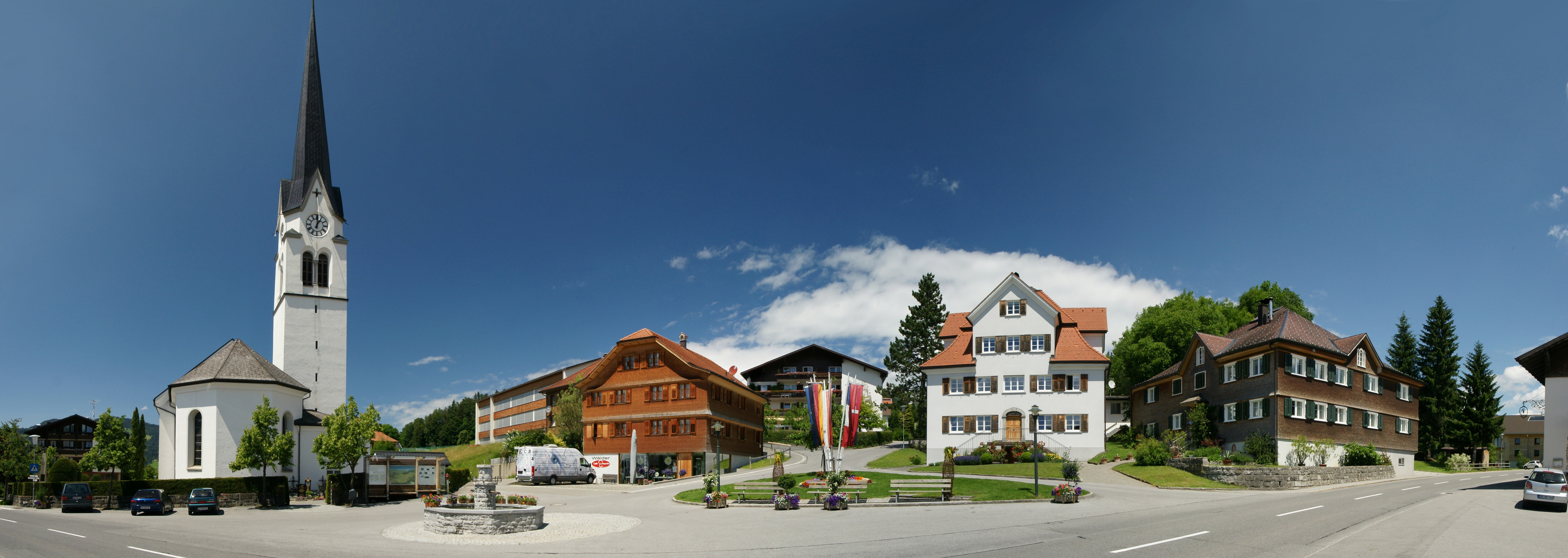
Panoramic view of Lingenau's city center

== Population ==
Historical population
Year	Pop.	±%
1869	1,022	—
1880	912	−10.8%
1890	932	+2.2%
1900	953	+2.3%
1910	1,068	+12.1%
1923	1,923	+80.1%
1934	954	−50.4%
1939	912	−4.4%
1951	1,007	+10.4%
1961	1,081	+7.3%
1971	1,171	+8.3%
1981	1,240	+5.9%
1991	1,327	+7.0%
2001	1,328	+0.1%
2011	1,337	+0.7%
