= Bolgenach =

River in Germany

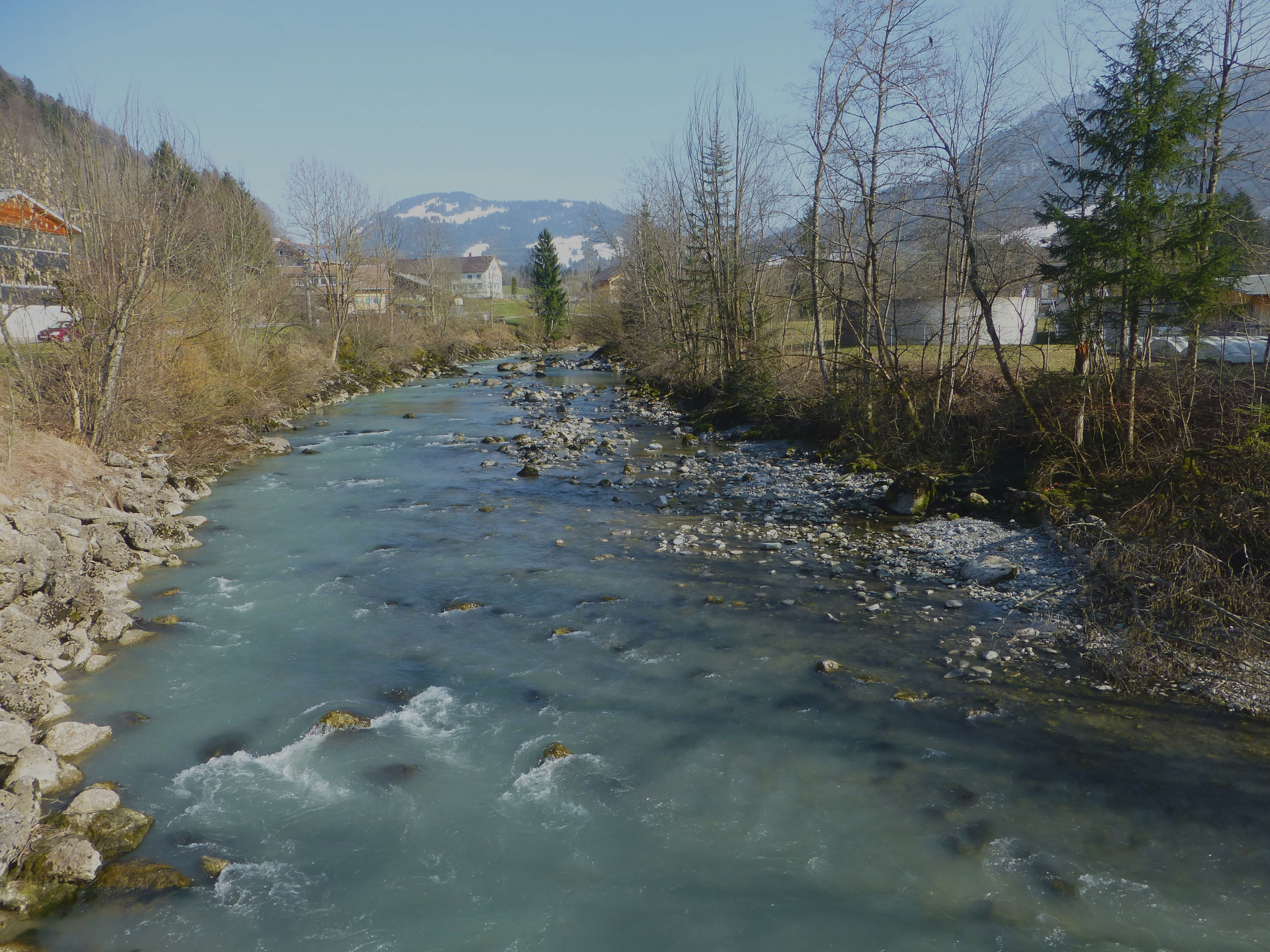
- The Bolgenach at Hittisau

Location
- Countries: Germany and Austria
- States: Bavaria and Vorarlberg

Physical characteristics
- Mouth
  - location: Weißach
  - coordinates: 47.355031°N 9.9202°E
- Length: 29.9 km (18.6 mi)

Basin features
- Progression: Weißach→ Bregenzer Ach→ Lake Constance→ Rhine→ North Sea

Bolgenach is a river of Bavaria, Germany and Vorarlberg, Austria. It flows into the Weißach near Krumbach.

== See also ==
- List of rivers of Bavaria
- List of rivers of Austria
