= Hochgrat =

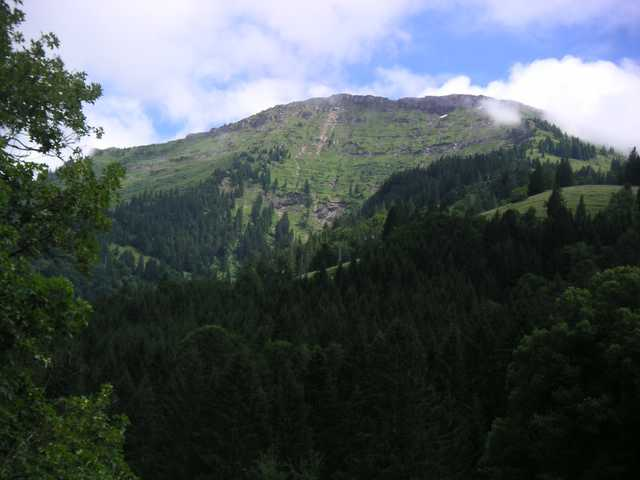
- Hochgrat by Oberstaufen

Highest point
- Elevation: 1,834 m (6,017 ft)
- Prominence: 714 m (2,343 ft)
- Coordinates: 47°29′43.4″N 10°04′43″E

Geography
- Location within Alps
- Location: Allgaeu, Bavaria, Germany
- Parent range: Allgäu Alps

Climbing
- Easiest route: Road from valley station

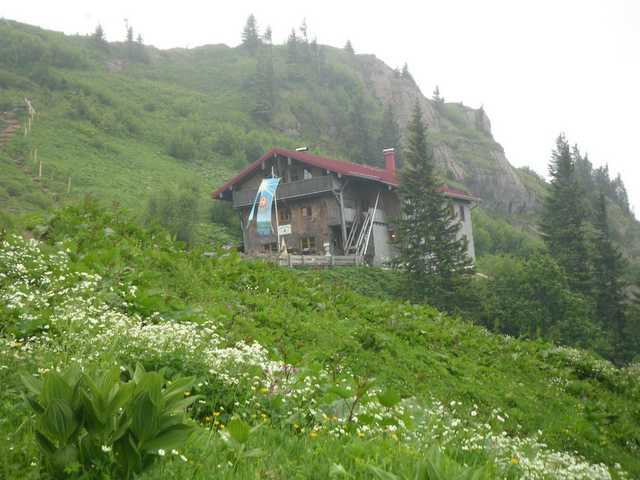
Staufner Haus of German Alpine Club Oberstaufen-Lindenberg

Hochgrat is an 1834 m high summit of the Allgäu Alps, highest mountain of the Nagelfluhkette (group of mountains consisting of conglomerate) and part of nature park Nagelfluhkette.
