= Steineberg (Allgäu Alps) =

Mountain in Bavaria, Germany

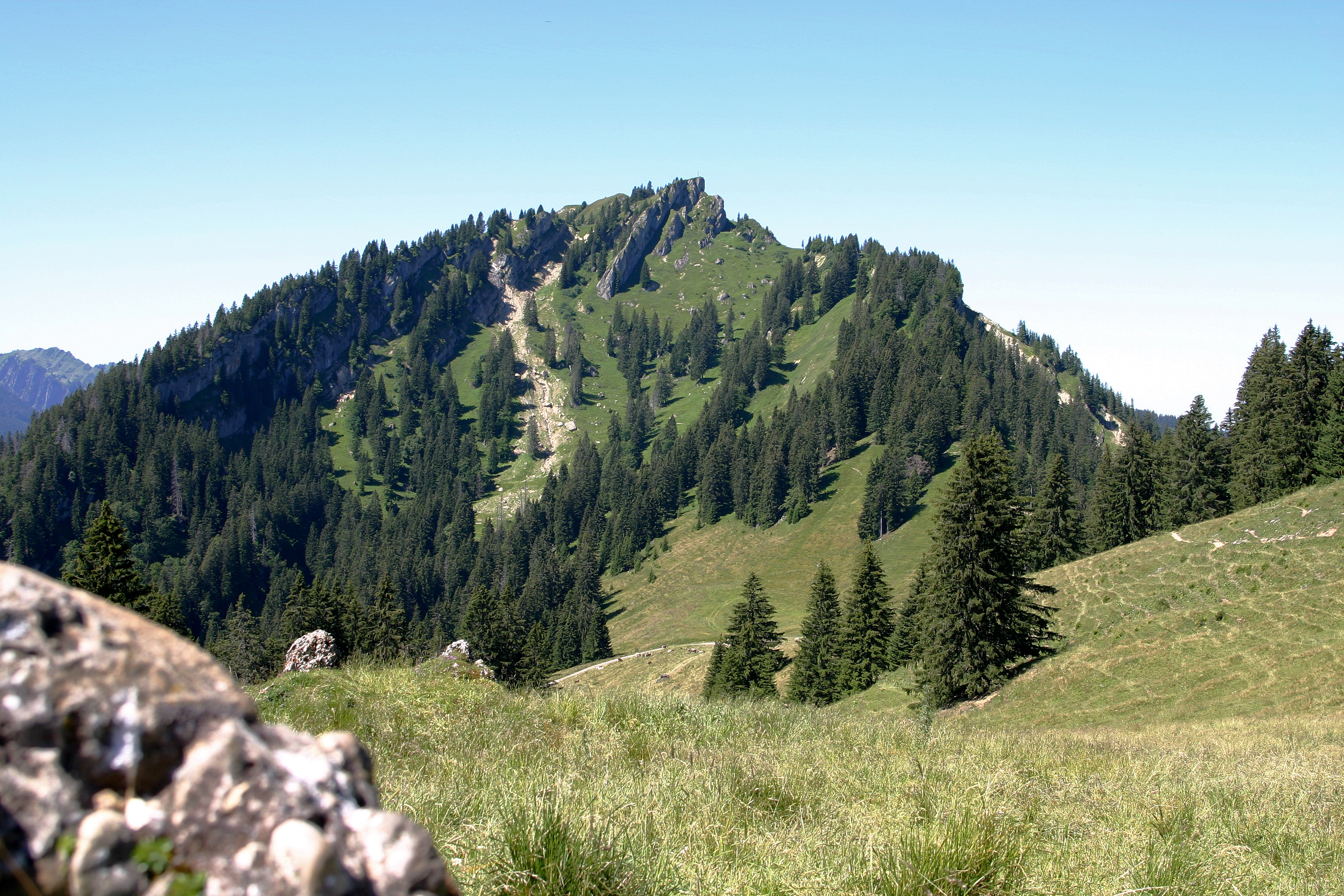
- Steineberg from Bärenköpfle

Highest point
- Elevation: 1,683 m (5,522 ft)
- Coordinates: 47°31′39″N 10°11′31″E

Geography
- Location: Bavaria, Germany

Steineberg is a mountain in Bavaria, Germany. The Steineberg is a part of the Nagelfluhkette Nature Park international project. The mountain's prominence is at least about 83 meters.

== Mountain fair ==
A mountain fair takes place at the end of August of each year at the summit cross of Steineberg. It is organized by the Trachtenverein Stoineberglar and the parish council of Immenstadt-Bühl-Rauhenzell and musically accompanied by a delegation of the Akams music band.
