= Daniel Nussbaumer =

Austrian footballer (born 1999)

Personal information
- Date of birth: 29 November 1999 (age 26)
- Place of birth: Langenegg, Austria
- Height: 1.89 m (6 ft 2 in)
- Position: Forward

Youth career
- 2008–2013: FC Langenegg
- 2013–2015: AKA Vorarlberg

Senior career*
Years	Team	Apps	(Gls)
2016–2018	Rheindorf Altach	3	(0)
2018–2019	VfB Stuttgart II	17	(1)
2019–2021	Rheindorf Altach	47	(8)
2021–2024	Académico de Viseu	35	(9)
2025	Admira Wacker	14	(3)
2025–2026	Schwarz-Weiß Bregenz	4	(3)
2026	Savoia	11	(2)

International career
2020	Austria U21	1	(0)
- * Club domestic league appearances and goals as of 3 May 2026

Daniel Nussbaumer (born 29 November 1999) is an Austrian professional footballer who plays as a forward.

== Club career ==
He made his Austrian Football Bundesliga debut for SC Rheindorf Altach on 28 May 2017 in a game against FC Red Bull Salzburg. In 2018 he signed up for the German club VfB Stuttgart II with a contract until June 2020.

On 30 August 2021, he moved to Académico de Viseu in Portugal. In 2022, he suffered a serious ankle injury, which sidelined him for an extended period.

== Personal life ==
Nussbaumer is the cousin of Lars Nussbaumer, who is also a professional footballer.
