= Mittagberg =

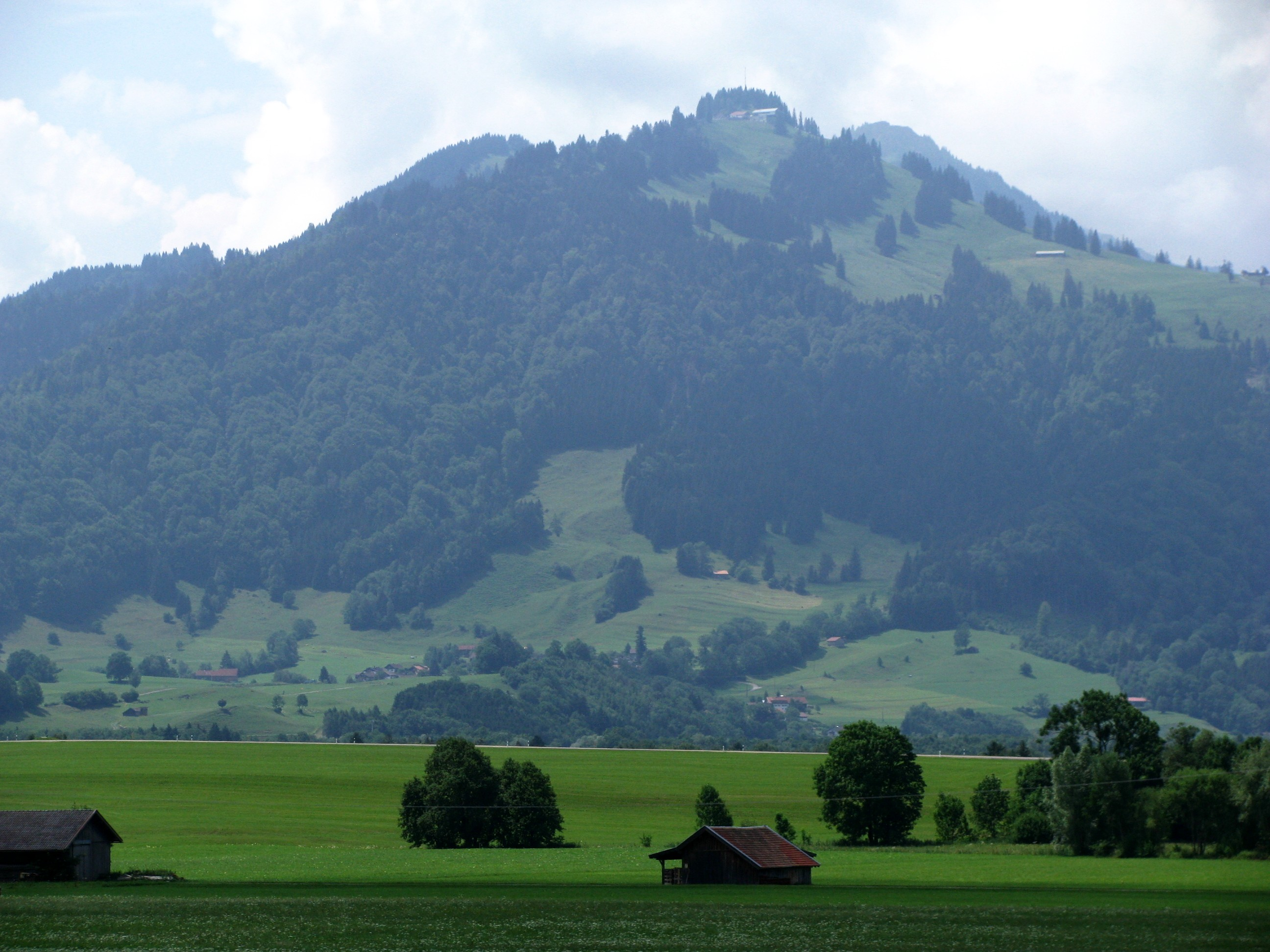
- Mittagberg from the direction of Rettenberg (North-East)

Highest point
- Elevation: 1,451 m (4,760 ft)Mittagberg
- Prominence: 0.5 m (1.6 ft)Mittagberg
- Coordinates: 47°42′10″N 10°12′56″E

Geography
- Location within Alps
- Location: Bavaria, Germany
- Parent range: Allgäu Prealps west of the Iller, Allgäu Alps

The Mittagberg ("Midday Mountain") is a 1,451-metre-high (4,760 ft) mountain located in the Allgäu Alps in Bavaria, Germany. Located just south of Immenstadt, this mountain is part of the Nagelfluh Chain, and eponymous nature park. Its vertical separation is at least 31 metres, metres, with a prominence of 500 metres when using the Bärenköpfle as reference.

== Name ==
When looking at the mountain from Immenstadt, the sun at noon is right on top of the peak, giving it its name "Mittag" based on the German word for noon (mid day).

== Routes ==
There are multiple hiking trails that lead up to the top of the mountain.

== Alternative routes ==
There is a ski lift that goes from Immenstadt to the top, with one interruption approximately in the middle of the mountain. During the winter, more ski lifts open for skiing. A 5.1-kilometre-long (3.2 mi) toboggan run leads from the summit of the mountain to Immenstadt.
