= Lars Nussbaumer =

Austrian footballer (born 2001)

Personal information
- Date of birth: 31 January 2001 (age 25)
- Place of birth: Langenegg, Austria
- Height: 1.75 m (5 ft 9 in)
- Position: Midfielder

Team information
- Current team: Schwarz-Weiß Bregenz
- Number: 8

Youth career
- 2008–2015: FC Langenegg
- 2008–2015: AKA Vorarlberg

Senior career*
Years	Team	Apps	(Gls)
2017–2020	Rheindorf Altach II	66	(10)
2018–2022	Rheindorf Altach	12	(0)
2020	→ FC Dornbirn (loan)	6	(0)
2022–2024	FC Dornbirn	54	(4)
2024–	Schwarz-Weiß Bregenz	53	(3)

International career
2016	Austria U15	5	(0)
2016–2017	Austria U16	6	(0)
2017	Austria U17	1	(0)
2019	Austria U18	1	(0)
2019	Austria U19	2	(0)
- * Club domestic league appearances and goals as of 12:18, 28 June 2026 (UTC)

Lars Nussbaumer (born 31 January 2001) is an Austrian professional footballer who plays as a midfielder for Schwarz-Weiß Bregenz.

== Club career ==
=== Early years ===
Nussbaumer was born in Langenegg, Vorarlberg, Austria and his career with local club FC Langenegg. In 2015, he joined the AKA Vorarlberg regional academy, where he in his first season at under-15 level was the top goalscorer of the league before suffering a broken collarbone in October 2015.

=== Rheindorf Altach ===
Ahead of the 2017–18 season, Nussbaumer moved to Rheindorf Altach, where he signed a contract that until June 2020. He would also remain part of the club's youth teams.

In July 2017, he made his debut for the reserve team in the Austrian Regionalliga, where he came on as a substitute for his cousin Daniel Nussbaumer in the 61st minute on the first matchday of that season against VfB Hohenems.

In February 2018, Nussbaumer was included in the first-team squad for the first time for the match against LASK. He made his professional debut in the Austrian Bundesliga on 27 May 2018, when he came off the bench for Patrick Salomon in the 85th minute of matchday 36 against Sturm Graz.

On 10 August 2020, he joined FC Dornbirn on loan, as part of the two clubs' cooperation agreement. After six appearances in the 2. Liga, he returned to Altach prematurely in November 2020.

=== FC Dornbirn ===
On 13 June 2022, Nussbaumer joined FC Dornbirn on a permanent deal, after having already spent six months on loan at the club in 2020.

== Personal life ==
Nussbaumer is the cousin of Daniel Nussbaumer, who is also a professional footballer.
