= Krumbach, Vorarlberg =

Krumbach
- Municipality
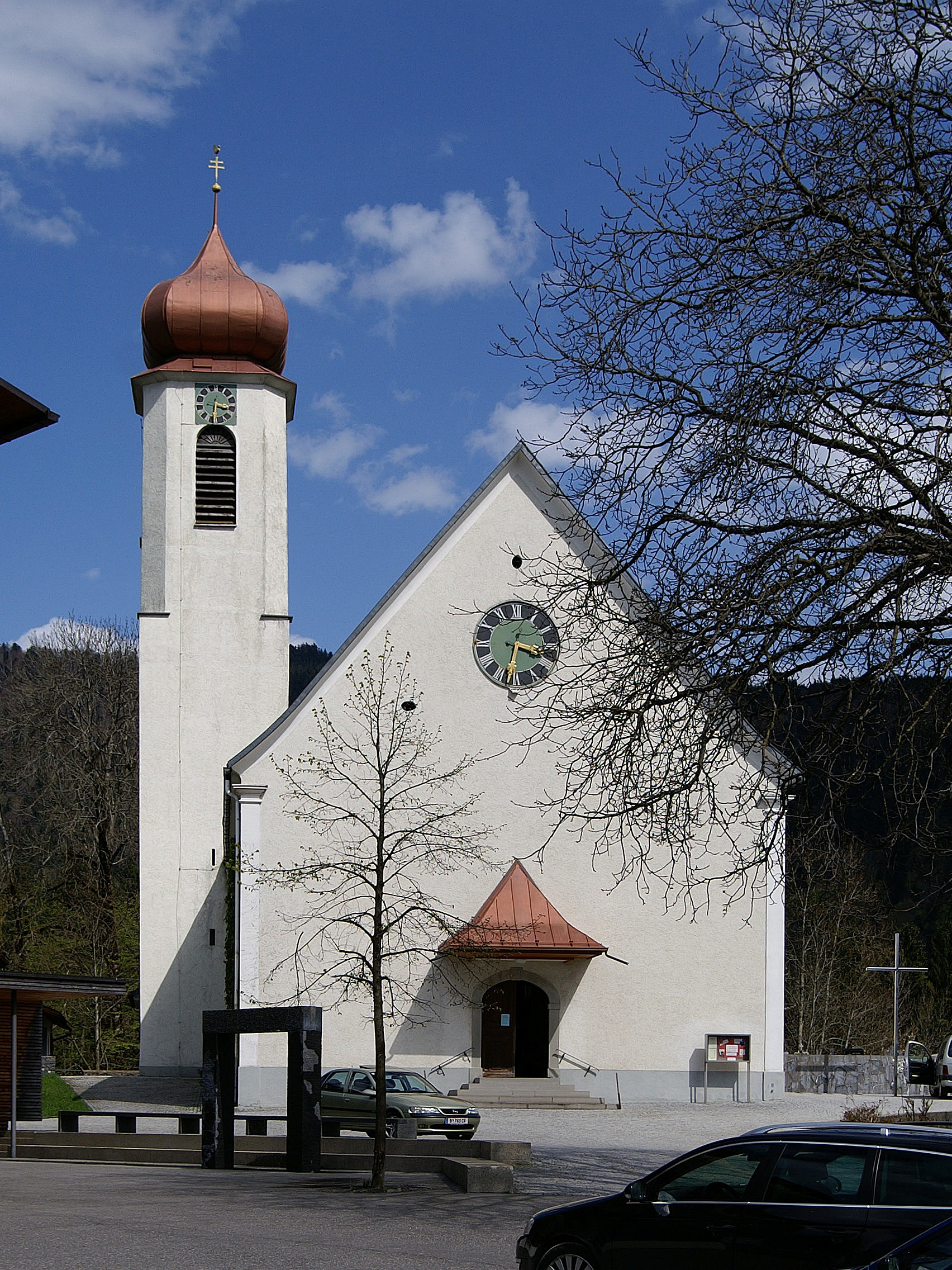

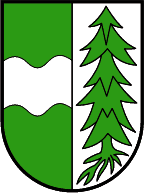
- Coat of arms

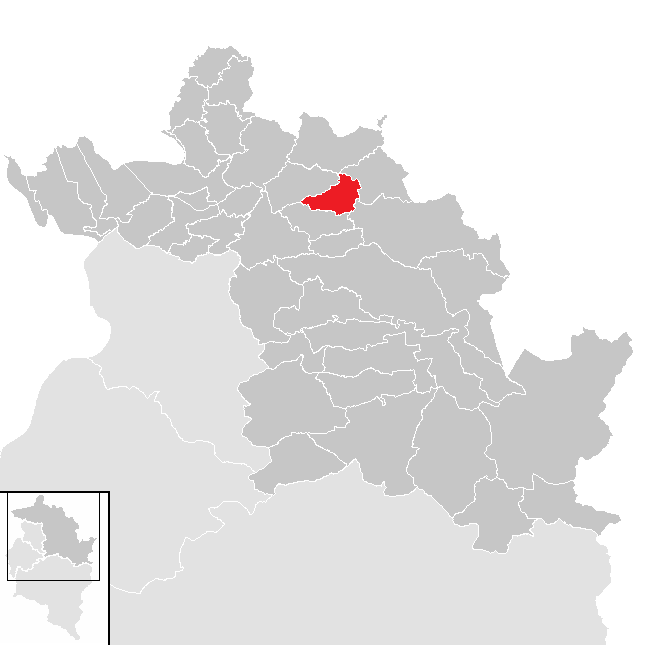
- Location in the district

- Location within Austria
- Coordinates: 47°28′59″N 09°56′09″E
- Country: Austria
- State: Vorarlberg
- District: Bregenz

Government
  - Mayor: Arnold Hirschbühl

Area
  - Total: 8.71 km^{2} (3.36 sq mi)
- Elevation: 732 m (2,402 ft)

Population (2018-01-01)
  - Total: 1,042
  - Density: 120/km^{2} (310/sq mi)
- Time zone: UTC+1 (CET)
  - Summer (DST): UTC+2 (CEST)
- Postal code: 6942
- Area code: 05513
- Vehicle registration: B
- Website: www.krumbach.at

Krumbach is a village in the westernmost Austrian state of Vorarlberg, in the Bregenz district. The municipality has about 1,000 inhabitants.

== Geography ==
Krumbach stretches over an area of 8.71 km². It lies in the "Vorderwald", which is part of the Bregenzerwald. Two rivers, the Weißach and the Bolgenach, flow through Krumbach. Numerous peat bogs are a special landscape feature.

Krumbach is a member of the German-Austrian community project Naturpark Nagelfluhkette.

== Culture ==
The parish church St. Martin was built by local builders and consecrated in 1806. The church interior has primarily Baroque features, with later additions from the 18th and 19th centuries.

The wooden Giessen Bridge, built in 1792, crosses over the river Bolgenach. Nowadays, the bridge is mainly used by hikers from Krumbach to Riefensberg.

In the course of the waterworks renewal in Krumbach in 1999, a "Dorfbrunnen" (village well) was commissioned. Designed by the Bregenzerwälder artist Herbert Meusburger, it represents a portal between the citizens and the church.

Krumbach is part of the Bregenzerwald Umgang (literally "Bregenzerwald Walking Tour"). This walking tour offers insights into the architecture and community planning of 12 traditional villages in the Bregenzerwald. While walking over various landscapes, visiting public buildings, homes and everyday objects, walkers gain a comprehensive overview of typical Bregenzerwald architectural styles as they developed throughout the ages. The focus of the Bregenz Forest Walk in Krumbach is on the extensive peat bogs.

=== Bus Stop Krumbach ===
Krumbach is known for its extraordinary bus stops, which were designed by seven international artists. In 2014, the project received special recognition as part of the Austrian National Architecture Awards, and won the National Award for PR.

The city's central bus stop, meant to reflect the particular character of the village center, was redesigned and renovated by the Bregenz Forest architects Bernardo Bader, René Bechter, and Hermann Kaufmann. New bus stops were also commissioned for the surrounding region. The Association Kultur Krumbach asked international designers to create seven small bus shelters for the community; emphasis was placed on the powerful local and regional craftsmanship traditions and indigenous materials, and local craftspeople were to carry out the constructions. The shelters were to synthesize traditional and modern cultural trends. In the end over 300 people were involved in the project.

The international architects chosen were:

- Alexander Brodsky (Russia)
- Rintala Eggertsson Architects (Norway)
- Architects de Vylder Vinck Taillieu (Belgium)
- Ensamble Studio Antón García-Abril (Spain)
- Smiljan Radic (Chile)
- Sou Fujimoto (Japan)
- Wang Shu and Lu Wenyu (China).

== Population ==
Historical population
Year	Pop.	±%
1869	1,009	—
1880	944	−6.4%
1890	888	−5.9%
1900	792	−10.8%
1910	755	−4.7%
1923	708	−6.2%
1934	737	+4.1%
1939	651	−11.7%
1951	771	+18.4%
1961	759	−1.6%
1971	778	+2.5%
1981	836	+7.5%
1991	913	+9.2%
2001	933	+2.2%
2011	990	+6.1%
