= Lanzenbach (Weißach) =

River in Germany

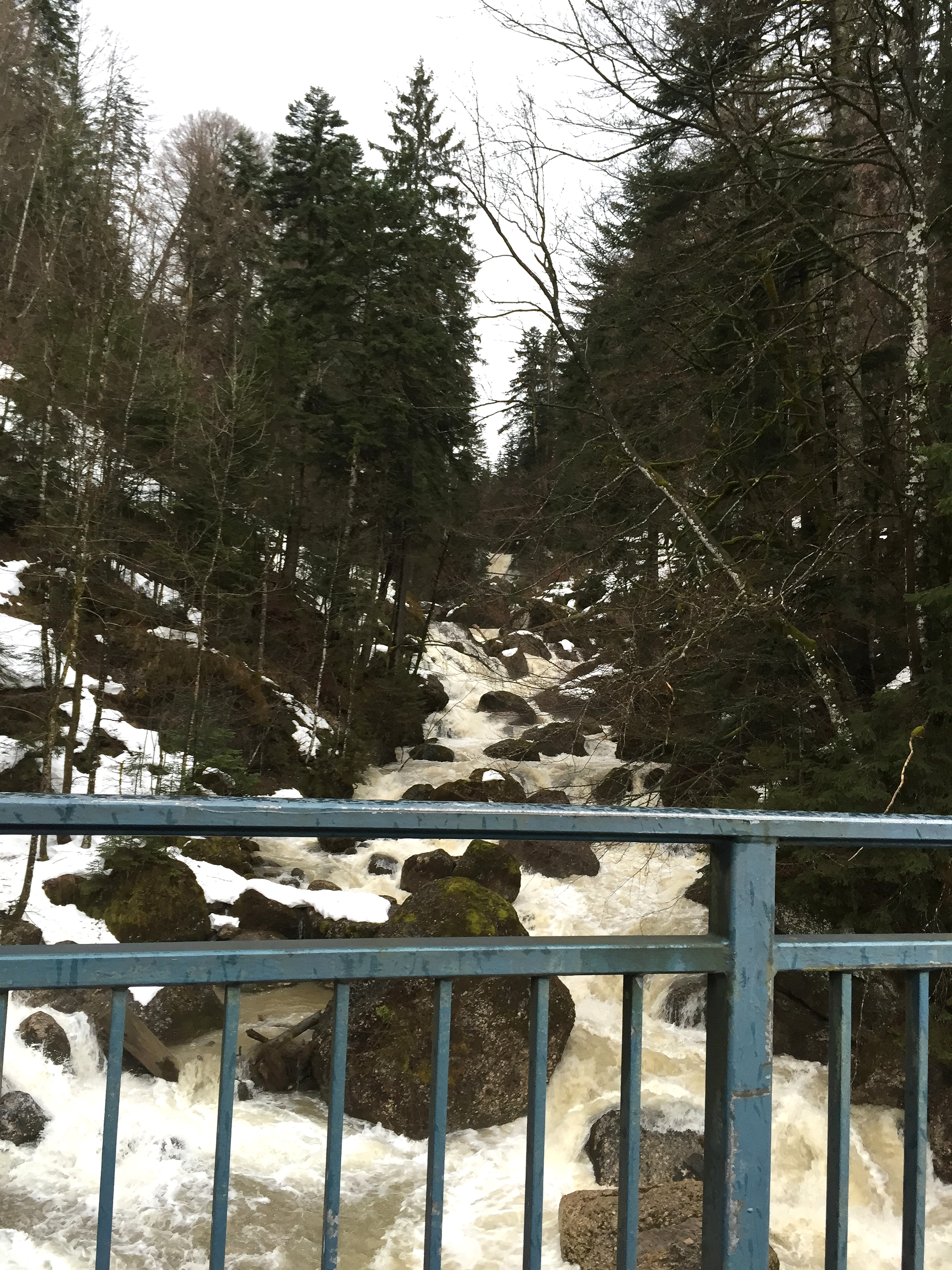
- The Lanzenbach shortly before its mouth

Location
- Country: Germany
- States: Bavaria

Physical characteristics
- Mouth
  - location: Weißach
  - coordinates: 47.5106°N 10.0518°E

Basin features
- Progression: Weißach→ Bregenzer Ach→ Lake Constance→ Rhine→ North Sea

Lanzenbach is a river of Bavaria, Germany. It is a tributary of the Weißach near Oberstaufen.

== See also ==
- List of rivers of Bavaria
