= Ingo Nussbaumer =

Austrian artist

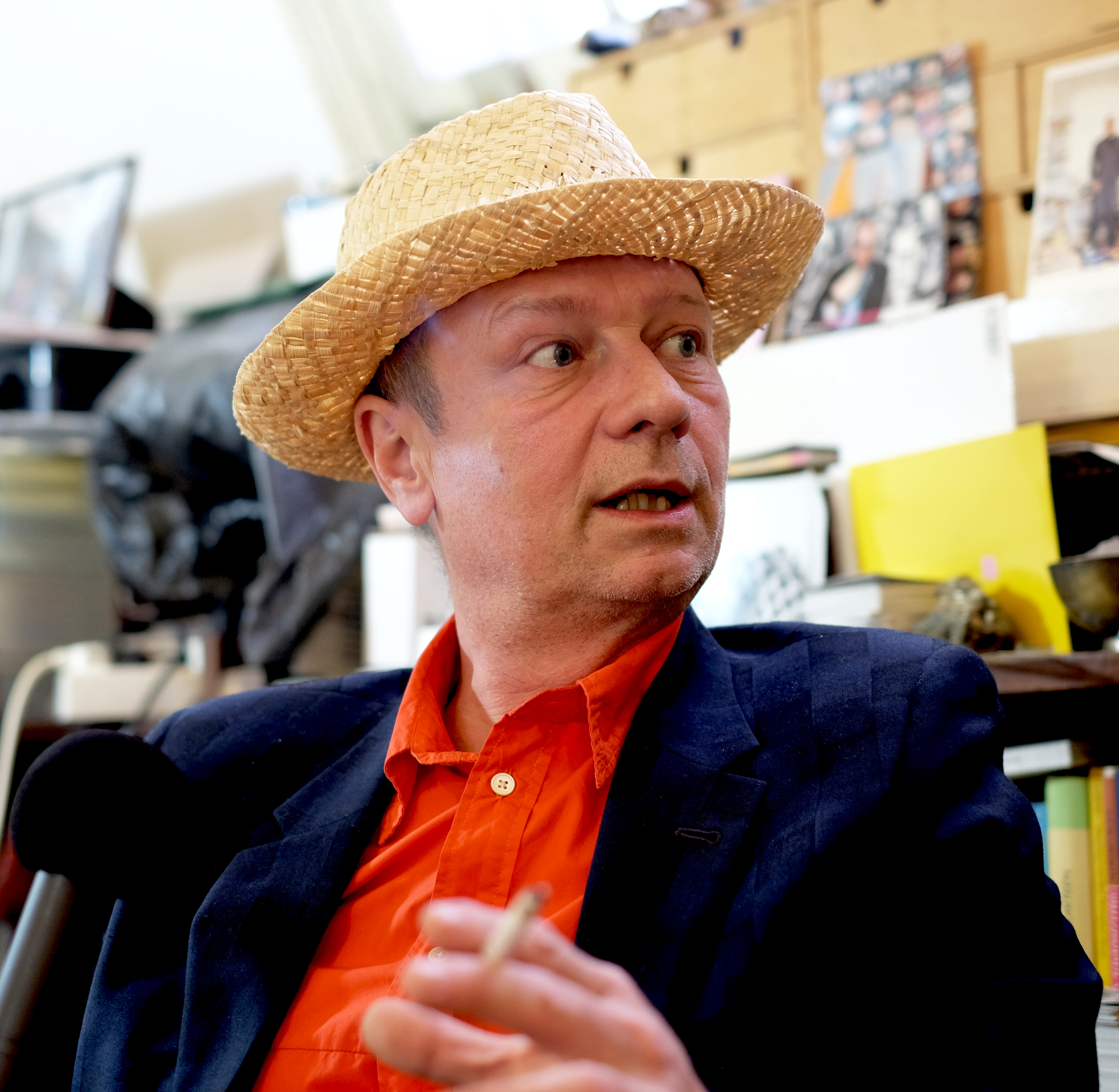
Ingo Nussbaumer at his studio in Vienna

Ingo Nussbaumer (* born 1 January 1956 in Leibnitz) is an Austrian artist and researcher.

== Life ==
Ingo Nussbaumer was born in St. Nikolai ob Draßling, a village in South Styria, Austria. Both of his parents were teachers. From 1976 to 1982 he attended university in Basel, Salzburg and Vienna, where he enrolled in painting and philosophy. After graduation, he opened his studio at Myrthengasse in Vienna. From 1987 to 1989, Nussbaumer, Eva Blimlinger, Ela Hornung-Ichikawa and Johannes Matthiesen managed a branch of the Free International University (FIU) for Creativity and Interdisciplinary Research at Nussbaumer's studio in Vienna to initiate a discourse on contemporary art.

In 2014, Nussbaumer accepted a position as a visiting professor at the University of Applied Arts Vienna. Furthermore, he cooperates with the Austrian architecture company querkraft architekten creating comprehensive color concepts. Their first joint project was completed in Vienna in 2015. Nussbaumer designed the façade of the ODO residential building in Ottakring.

Ingo Nussbaumer lives and works in Vienna and Stettenhof.

== Work ==
Nussbaumer's research on color and color effects encompasses both his artistic and theoretical body of work The artist’s artwork can be divided into two groups: painting and spectral objects. Inspired by Bauhaus and abstract expressionism, Nussbaumer's early work also engaged with non-relational painting, an approach introduced by Donald Judd and Frank Stella.

Nussbaumer's paintings explore the formation of space through color constellation. Nussbaumer himself refers to it as "Farbraum" (color-space). A color and its nuanced variations such as shade and colour temperature can create space. Investigating the behavior and interaction of variables, such as color nuance, light, darkness, shadow, perspective, the real and the imaginary, he creates elaborate painting series, which can encompass more than twenty works and cover several years in production. Nussbaumer began referring to these studies as "color proposition" in 1997.

According to Nussbaumer, the term color proposition implies that color constellation can constitute meaning. Thus color arrangements can form a structure, which produces statements beyond mimetic representation. On thorough examination of these color structures one can read and understand their “Farbgestalt" (color, form and character).

“Kaspar Hausers Versuch die befohlene Tonlage zu torpedieren (Kaspar Hauser's attempt to torpedo the commanded pitch)," for example, is a current ongoing series of aquarelle paintings that works with repetition and variation. A selection, conducted between 2013 and 2015, was exhibited by Galerie Hubert Winter at the viennacontemporary art fair 2015.

Nussbaumer's paintings are carried out in oil, alkyd, as well as aquarelle. His watercolor based work applies a stencil technique, developed by Nussbaumer to create sharp-edged, intertwined color fields.

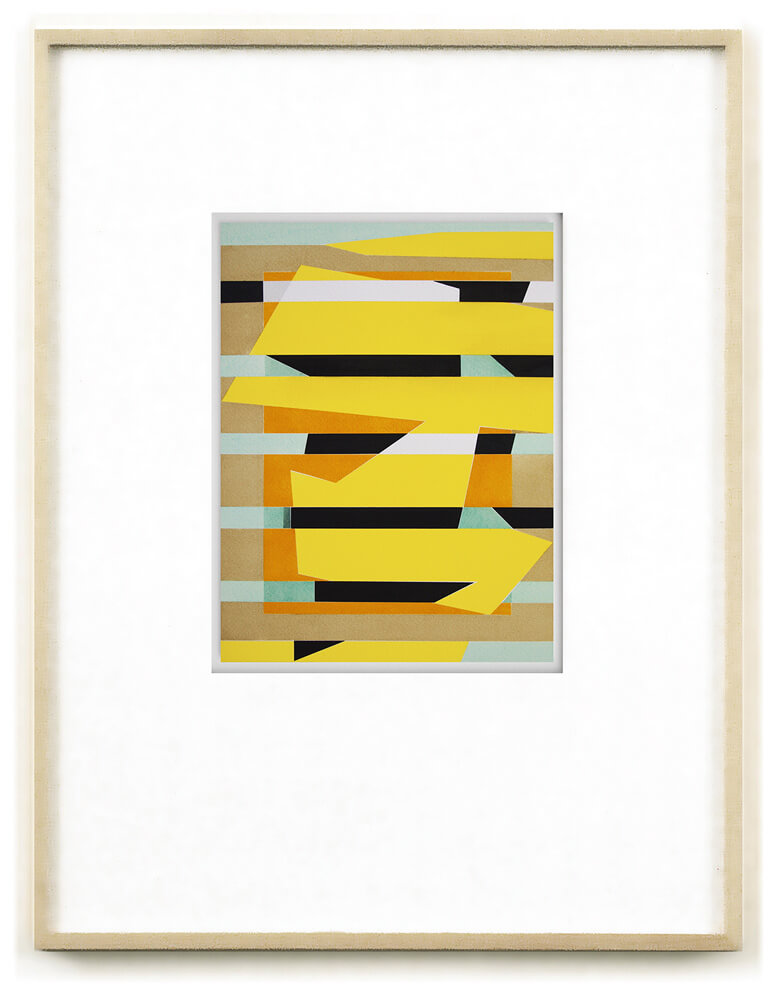
color proposition 0217

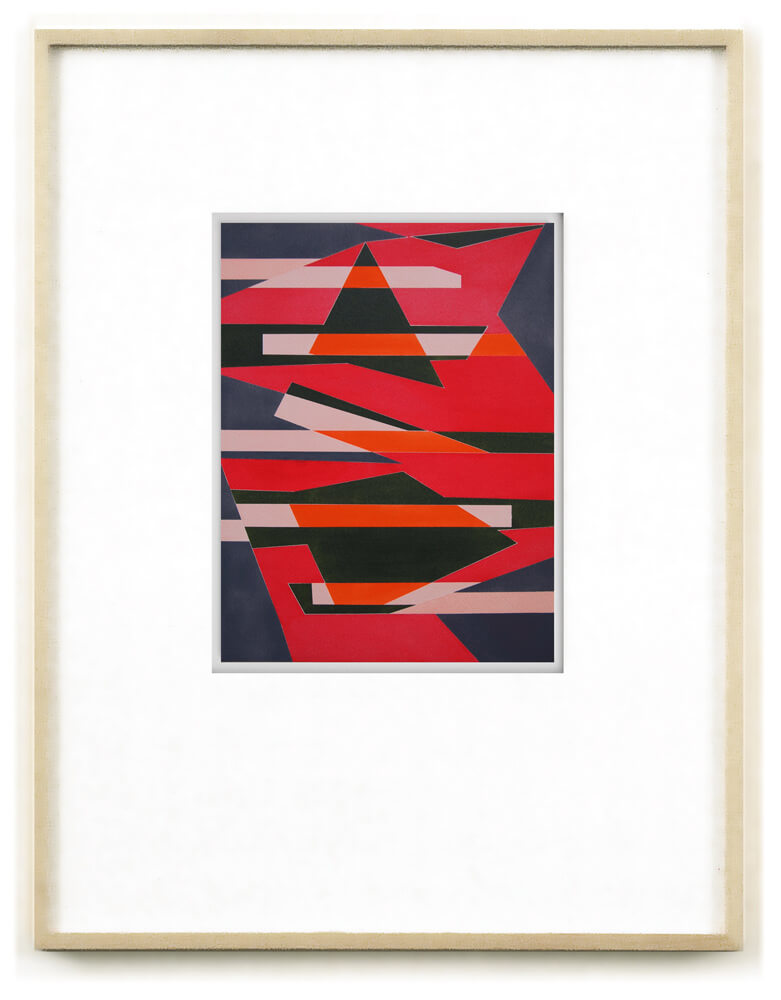
color proposition 0227

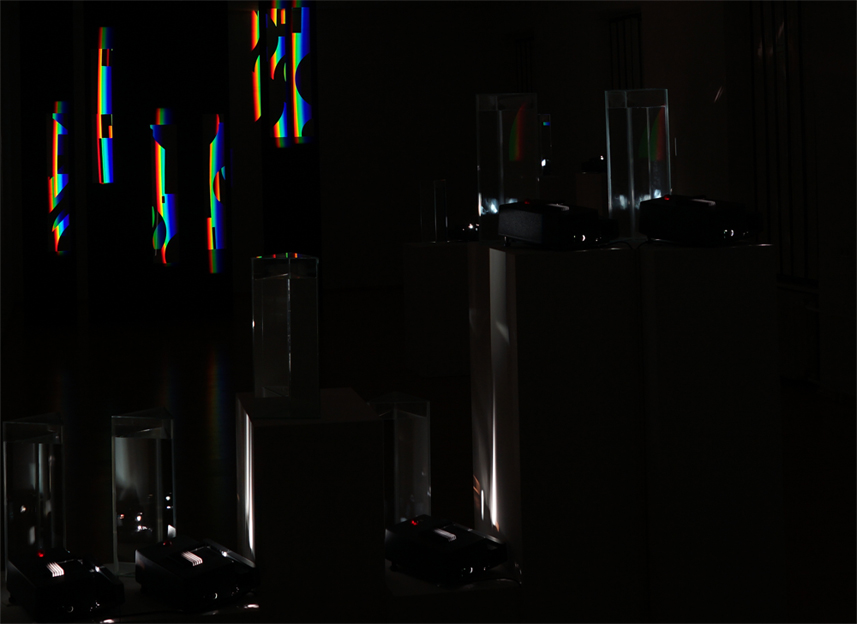
Detail of the light-installation "Hollows in Newton's Garden" at Galerie Marenzi, Austria, in 2018

Nussbaumer's spectral light installations deploy prisms and stencils, which he created after extensive experiments on color effects. All his objects operate with spectral light phenomena. He employs slide projectors with a slit or a small shadowing balk to shoot light through large water prisms. The refracted light beams are collected on custom-built screens to fragment the spectral light phenomena. Additional prisms are installed, which on inspection show new color constellations and variations to the original color set.

For more than ten years, he investigated the reciprocal effect of prismatic colors, thereby expanding Josef Albers' work "Interaction of Color" into the spectral color medium. In reference to Wolfgang Goethe's experimental method of variation, Nussbaumer refined Goethe's approach on color by incorporating Isaac Newton's groundbreaking work on optics and the color spectrum. In 1995, Nussbaumer's phenomenological research on spectral colors resulted in the discovery of six new irregular color spectra to which he refers as "Unordentliche Spektren". With the incorporation of both Wolfgang Goethe's methodology in optics, as well as Isaac Newton's optical experimentum crucis, Nussbaumer's findings in his research on spectral color effects allowed for a discourse between art, philosophy and physics.

== Exhibitions ==
- 2016: AUGEN-BLICKE. Museum Liaunig, Neuhaus/ Suha.
- 2016: ABSTRAKT-SPATIAL Malerei im Raum. Kunsthalle Krems, Krems.
- 2013: Ingo Nussbaumer. Galerija Vartai, Vilnius.
- 2011: Virtual Color Tubes. Light, Fragmentation, Restitution. Vasarely Museum Budapest, Budapest.
- 2011: streng geometrisch. Museum Moderner Kunst Kärnten MMKK, Klagenfurt.
- 2010: Working Shade. Formed Light. A Serial and Spectral Color Project. Humboldt-Universität zu Berlin, Berlin.
