= Stuiben =

Mountain in Bavaria, Germany

Coordinates: 47°31′N 10°10′E

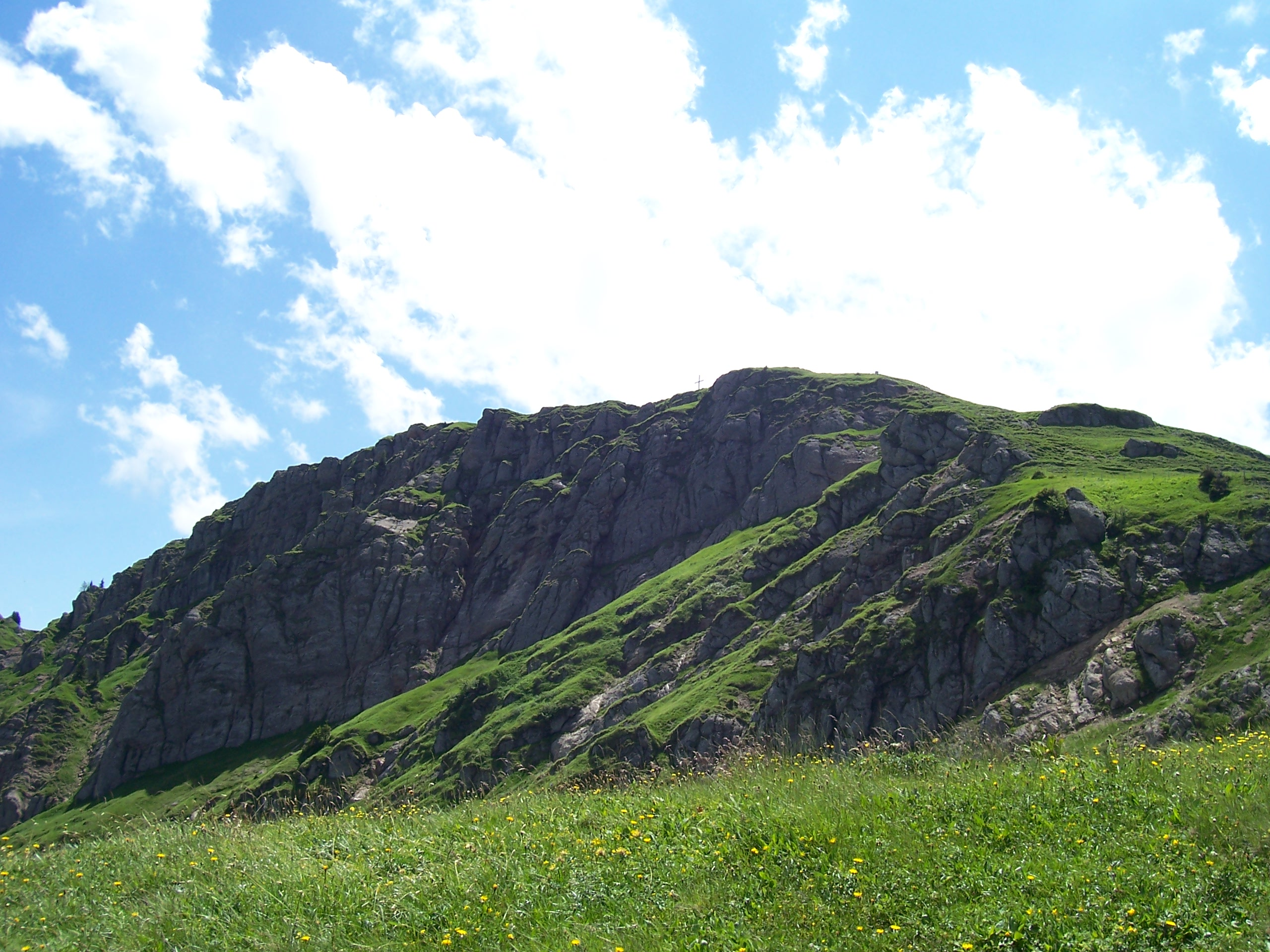
- Stuiben

Highest point
- Elevation: 1,749 m (5,738 ft)

Geography
- Location: Bavaria, Germany

Stuiben is a mountain of Bavaria, Germany.
