= Langenegg =

- Municipality
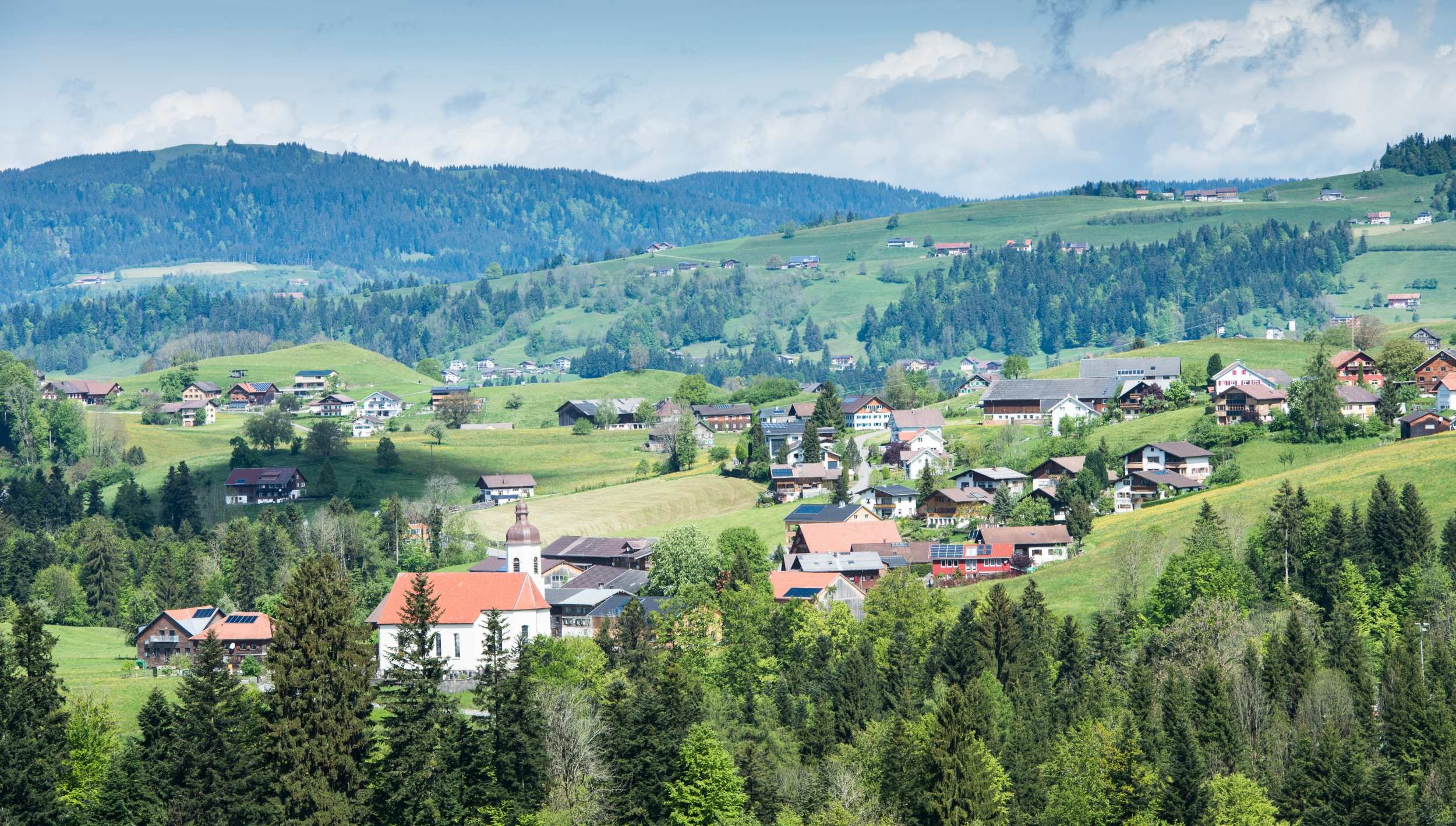

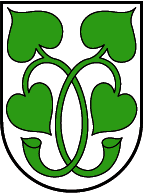
- Coat of arms

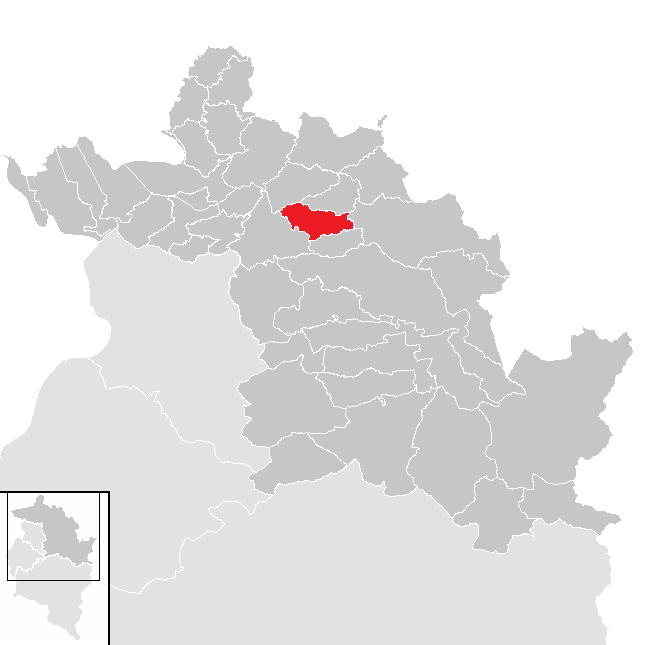
- Location in the district

- Location within Austria
- Coordinates: 47°28′05″N 09°53′49″E
- Country: Austria
- State: Vorarlberg
- District: Bregenz

Government
  - Mayor: Kurt Krottenhammer

Area
  - Total: 10.47 km^{2} (4.04 sq mi)
- Elevation: 700 m (2,300 ft)

Population (2018-01-01)
  - Total: 1,133
  - Density: 108.2/km^{2} (280.3/sq mi)
- Time zone: UTC+1 (CET)
  - Summer (DST): UTC+2 (CEST)
- Postal code: 6941
- Area code: 05513
- Vehicle registration: B
- Website: www.langenegg.at

Langenegg is a municipality with approx. 1,200 inhabitants in the westernmost Austrian state, Vorarlberg.

== Geography ==
Langenegg is located in the Bregenz Forest, in the district of Bregenz east of Lake Constance. It covers an area of 10.47 km^{2}, 38.6% of which is forested and 54.6% of which is used for agricultural purposes. Geographically, the municipality forms a "long corner", hence the name Langenegg (German: Egg ≈ Eck(e) = corner). The town is a member of the German-Austrian joint project Nagelfluhkette National Park.

=== Neighbouring communities ===
Langenegg borders on five other communities in Vorarlberg: Doren, Krumbach, Hittisau, Lingenau and Alberschwende.

== History ==
The Habsburgs ruled the cities in Vorarlberg partly from Tyrol and from Further Austria. From 1805 to 1814 Vorarlberg belonged to Bavaria, then reverted to Austria. Langenegg has been part of Vorarlberg since its founding in 1861. It was part of the French occupation zone from 1945 to 1955. On July 6, 2010 Langenegg won the competition for the 11th European Village Renewal Award.

=== Coat of arms ===
The Langenegg coat of arms was created by the Schrunser artist and heraldist Konrad Honold in 1969.

== Population ==
Historical population
Year	Pop.	±%
1869	1,049	—
1880	1,010	−3.7%
1890	908	−10.1%
1900	1,003	+10.5%
1910	808	−19.4%
1923	838	+3.7%
1934	798	−4.8%
1939	712	−10.8%
1951	763	+7.2%
1961	718	−5.9%
1971	705	−1.8%
1981	807	+14.5%
1991	972	+20.4%
2001	1,026	+5.6%
2011	1,070	+4.3%

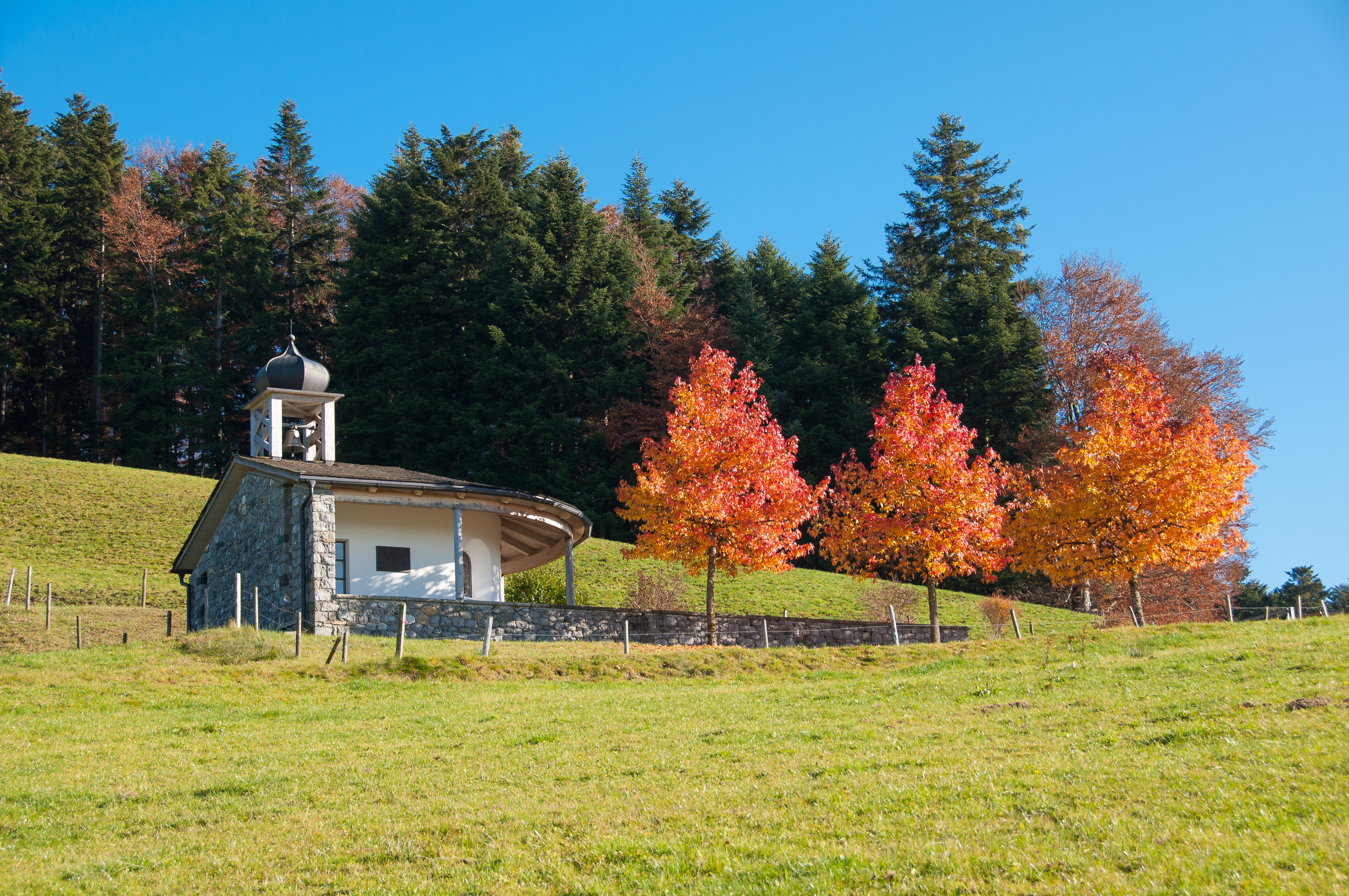
Hubertus chapel

== Politics ==
The Langeneggian municipal council consists of 15 members. The election took place during the last local council elections in 2015 not by party lists, but by majority vote. The mayor of the municipality is Kurt Krottenhammer.

== Economy and infrastructure ==
Agriculture plays an important role. The share of agricultural land in the total area is approx. 54%. There are 42 farms, of which 35 are dairy farms. The cheese factory produces over 250 tons of cheese each year.

During the industrialisation in Langenegg, the number of commuters working in the neighbouring municipalities increased. Unlike many municipalities in the region, Langenegg did not have a rich tradition of craft associations. The municipality has tried numerous economic initiatives such as the "Talent", the Langenegger currency that supports business in the village.

=== Education ===
There is a primary school and kindergarten.

== Culture ==
The parish church "Unserer lieben Frau" (Maria) was built in 1775 in the Baroque style.

The Hubertus chapel at Hälisbühl was built in 1992.

Langenegg is part of the Bregenzerwald Umgang (literally "Bregenzerwald Walking Tour"). This walking tour offers insights into the architecture and community planning of 12 traditional villages in the Bregenzerwald. While walking over various landscapes, visiting public buildings, homes and everyday objects, walkers gain a comprehensive overview of typical Bregenzerwald architectural styles as they developed throughout the ages.

The Sennerei Langenegg (a dairy) resulted from a 1978 fusion of three dairies, built in 1900, 1947 and 1952. This larger dairy has 30 suppliers for milk (from about 450 cows) and is part of the Käsestraße Bregenzerwald – a partnership of farmers, dairymen, artisans and gastronomers in the Bregenzerwald. Their aims include promoting small-scale agriculture, a diversity of local products, and the Vorarlberg cheese culture.

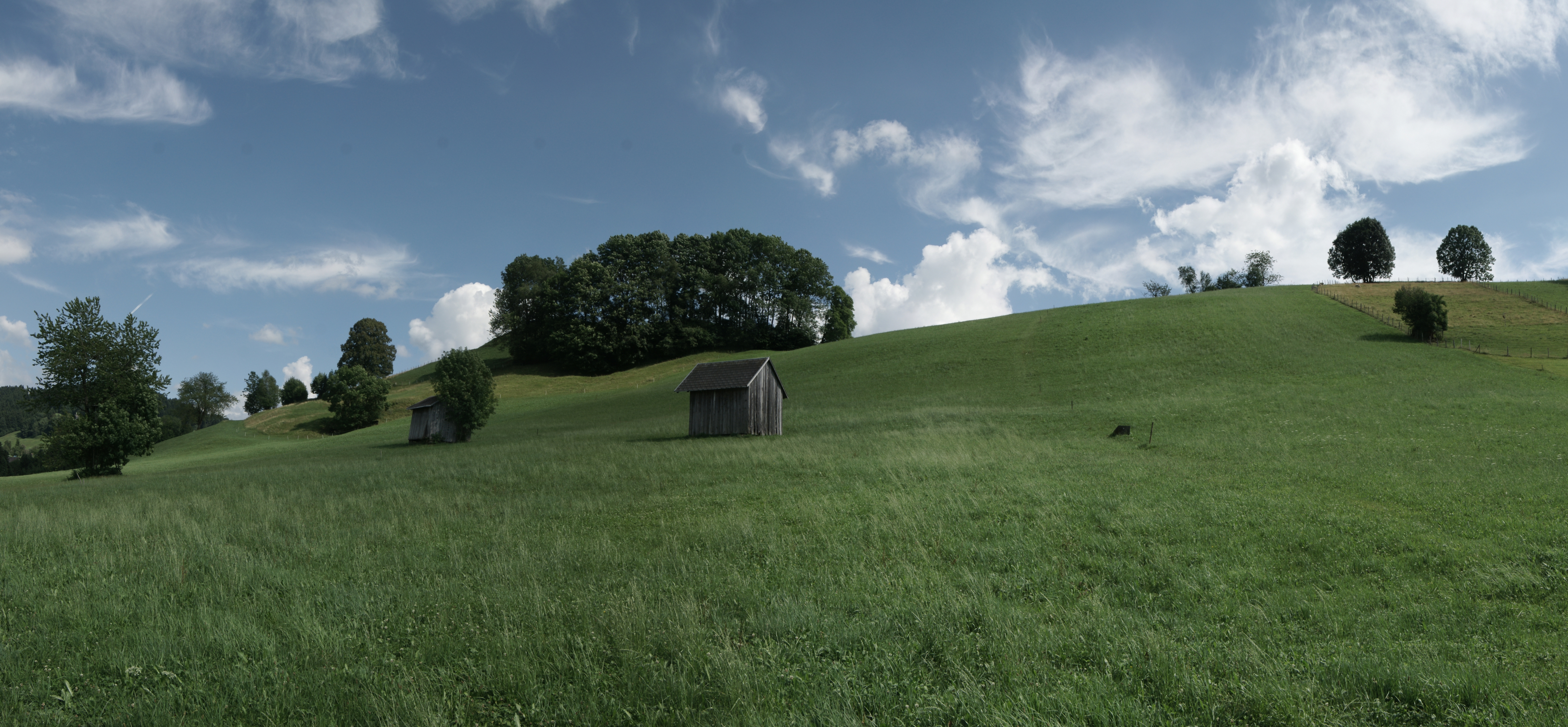
Panoramic view of the Finkenbühel meadow in Langenegg
