= Weißach (Bregenzer Ach) =

River in Germany

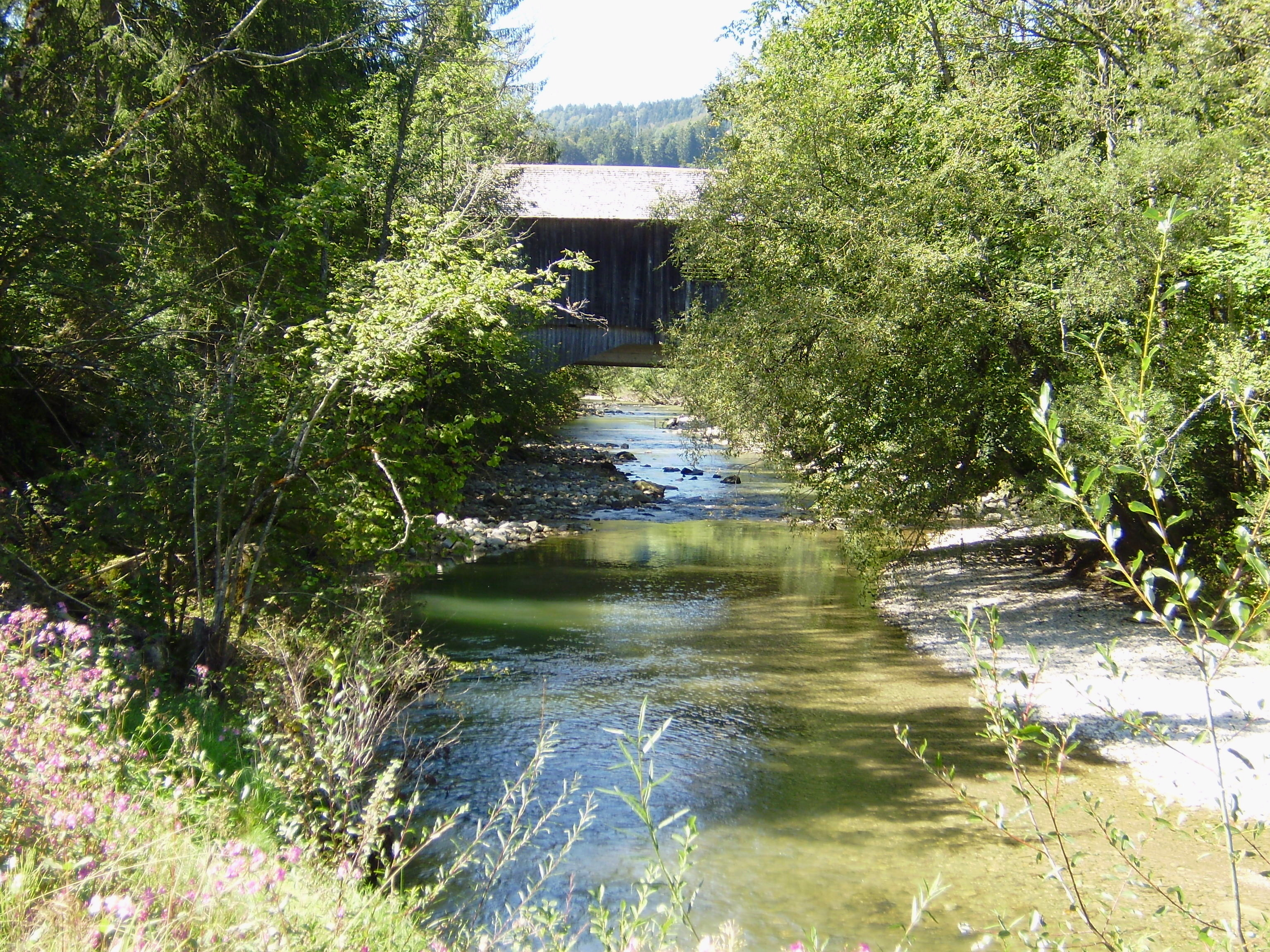
- The Weißach near the Gschwendmühl Bridge near the state border

Location
- Countries: Germany and Austria
- Reference no.: DE: 2144, AT: 811144

Physical characteristics
- Source
  - location: On the Dreherberg (1,430 m above NN)
  - coordinates: 47°32′03″N 10°09′37″E
  - elevation: ca. 1,360 m above sea level (NN)
- Mouth
  - location: Between Langenegg and Doren into the Bregenzer Ach
  - coordinates: 47°28′30″N 9°51′16″E
  - elevation: 465 m (AA)
- Length: 33.5 km (20.8 mi)
- Basin size: 216 km^{2} (83 sq mi)

Basin features
- Progression: Bregenzer Ach→ Lake Constance→ Rhine→ North Sea
- Tributaries
  - left: Bolgenach
  - right: Eibelebach

The Weißach is a 33.5-kilometre-long (20.8 mi), right-hand, eastern tributary of the Bregenzer Ach in the German and Austrian Alps. It forms a very short section of the Austria–Germany border, just south of the confluence with the Eibelebach. It flows into the Bregenzer Ach near Doren.

== See also ==
- List of rivers of Bavaria
- List of rivers of Austria
