= Rindalphorn =

Mountain in Bavaria, Germany

Coordinates: 47°30′N 10°06′E

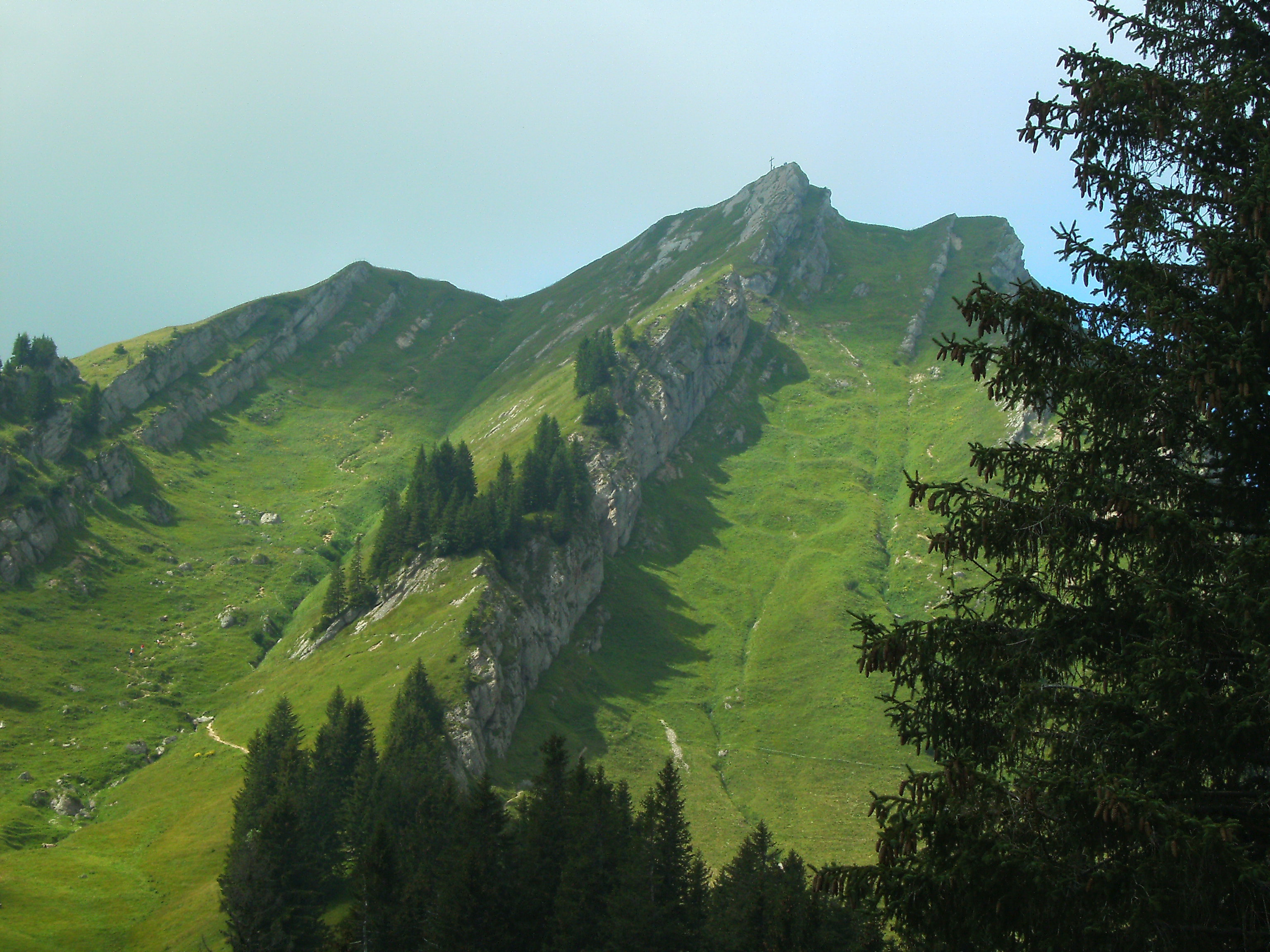
- Rindalphorn from the Gündlesscharte

Highest point
- Elevation: 1,821 m (5,974 ft)

Geography
- Location: Bavaria, Germany

Rindalphorn is a mountain of Bavaria, Germany.
