= Bärenköpfle (Nagelfluh chain) =

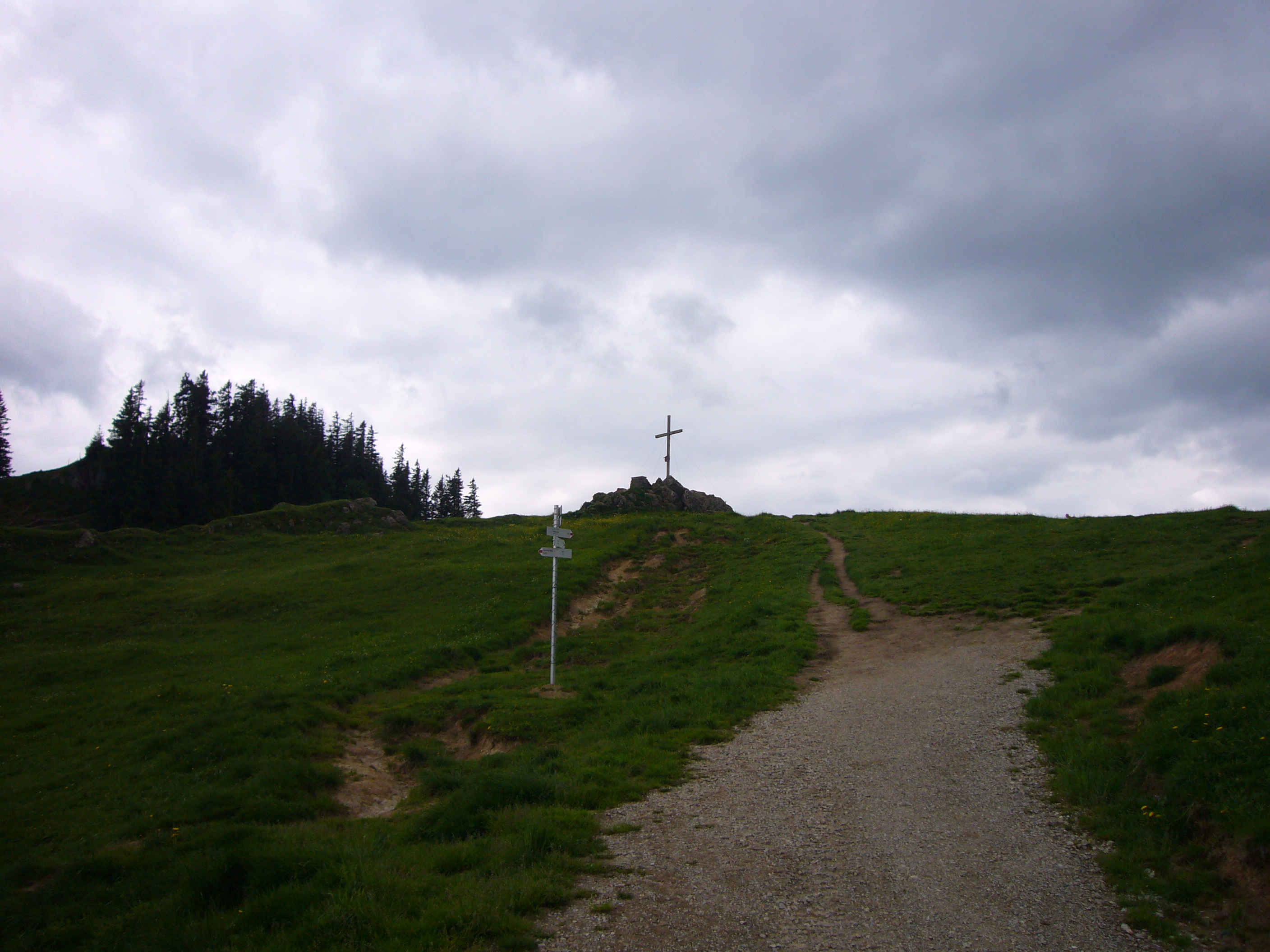
- Bärenköpfle

Highest point
- Elevation: 1,476 m (4,843 ft)
- Coordinates: 47°31′54″N 10°12′40″E

Geography
- Location: Bavaria, Germany

Bärenköpfle is a mountain of Bavaria, Germany.
