= Hittisau =

- Municipality
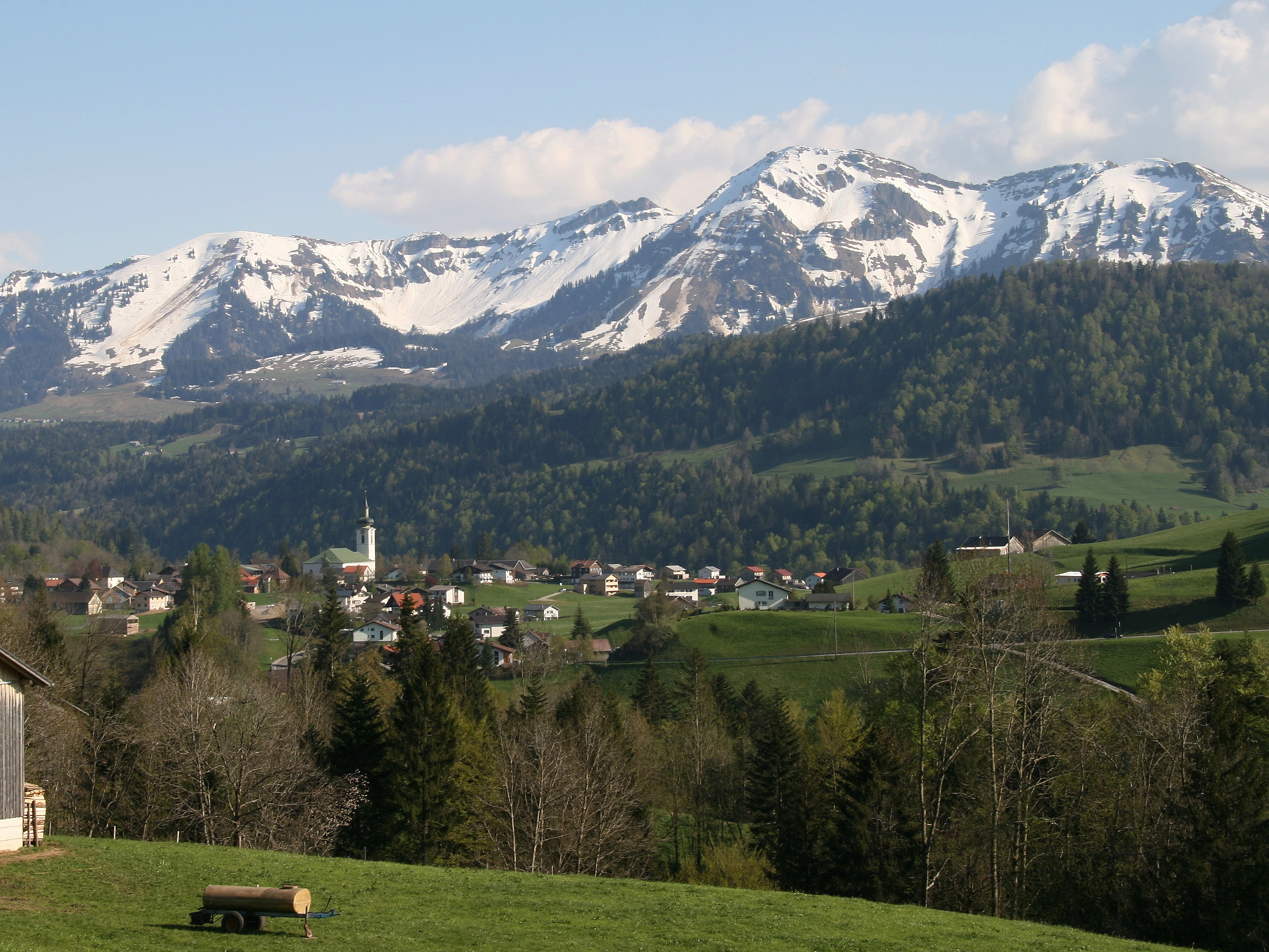

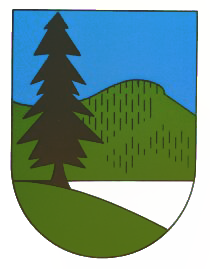
- Coat of arms

- Location within Austria
- Coordinates: 47°27′37″N 09°57′24″E
- Country: Austria
- State: Vorarlberg
- District: Bregenz

Government
  - Mayor: Gerhard Beer

Area
  - Total: 46.68 km^{2} (18.02 sq mi)
- Elevation: 798 m (2,618 ft)

Population (2018-01-01)
  - Total: 2,032
  - Density: 43.53/km^{2} (112.7/sq mi)
- Time zone: UTC+1 (CET)
  - Summer (DST): UTC+2 (CEST)
- Postal code: 6952
- Area code: 05513
- Vehicle registration: B
- Website: www.hittisau.at

Hittisau is a municipality in the district of Bregenz in the Austrian state of Vorarlberg. Hittisau has a surface area of 46.65 km^{2}. It lies in the Bregenzerwald in the west of the country.

Hittisau is a member of the German-Austrian community project Naturpark Nagelfluhkette.

== Population ==
Historical population
| Year | Pop. | ±% |
|---|---|---|
| 1869 | 1,992 | — |
| 1880 | 1,842 | −7.5% |
| 1890 | 1,624 | −11.8% |
| 1900 | 1,582 | −2.6% |
| 1910 | 1,581 | −0.1% |
| 1923 | 1,550 | −2.0% |
| 1934 | 1,641 | +5.9% |
| 1939 | 1,484 | −9.6% |
| 1951 | 1,661 | +11.9% |
| 1961 | 1,565 | −5.8% |
| 1971 | 1,560 | −0.3% |
| 1981 | 1,638 | +5.0% |
| 1991 | 1,721 | +5.1% |
| 2001 | 1,802 | +4.7% |
| 2011 | 1,829 | +1.5% |

== History ==
In 1249, "Hittinsowe" was reported for the first time in a document. In 1754, Hittisau counted 1000 inhabitants, in 1850 there were 2087 Hittisauers. In 1908 electricity came to the municipality. The water company was built in 1929.

== Culture ==
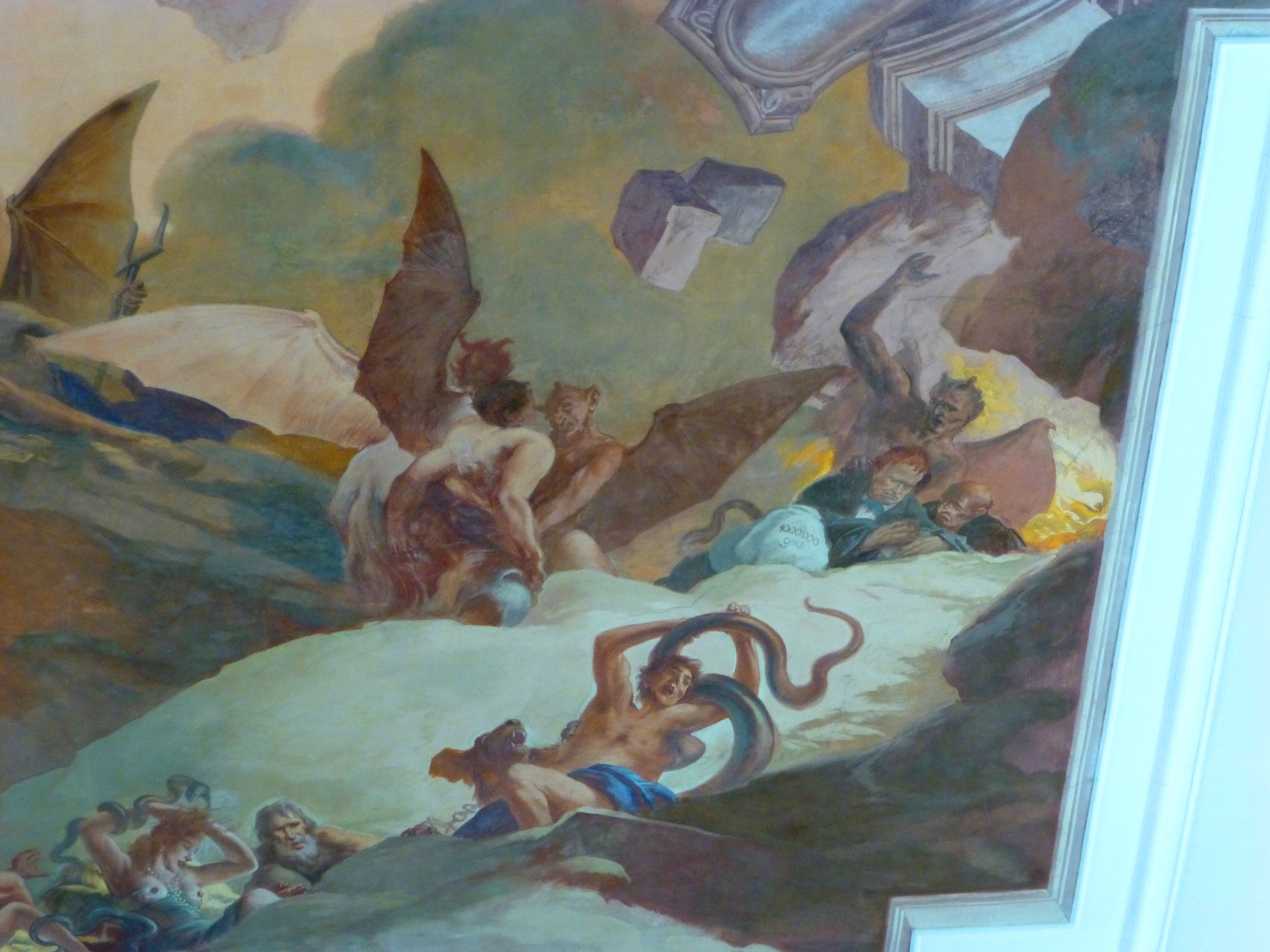
Propagandist ceiling painting with Winston Churchill and a sack of gold in purgatory by Waldemar Kolmsperger (1941)

The parish church Hl. Drei Könige was built from 1843 to 1845. The artist Josef Bucher painted the canvas (of the three kings) for the high altar around 1850. Christian Moosbrugger contributed a lot to the sculpture of the church. The organ was built in 1868 by the Rankweiler organ builder Alois Schönach.

In 1977, the Sennerei Hittisau (cheese factory Hittisau) was founded. The cheese factory concentrated mainly on the production of Emmental cheese. Since the EU membership in 1995, the production has focused on Hittisauer Bergkäse. Today, the cheese factory in Hittisau is one of the largest in the Bregenzerwald with around 5 million kilograms of milk delivered per year; it still produces cheese in the traditional Vorarlberg way. The cheese factory is part of the KäseStraße Bregenzerwald. The Alpsennereimuseum, also located in Hittisau, informs about the alpine cheese production that has been going on for centuries.

The Frauenmuseum (Women's museum) in Hittisau was opened in 2000 and is devoted to the achievements of women. It is the only museum in Austria whose goal it is to make women visible and document female representatives of art and culture.

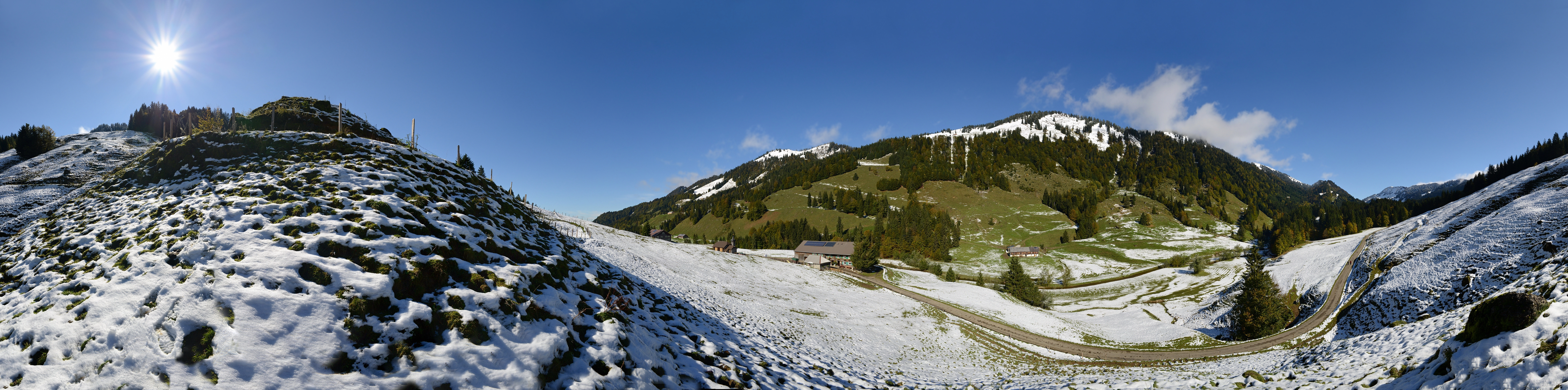
Lecknertal

== Notable People From Hittisau ==
- Hans Weiss (author) b.1950
