= Bregenzerwald traditional costume (Juppe) =

Traditional clothing of Vorarlberg, Austria

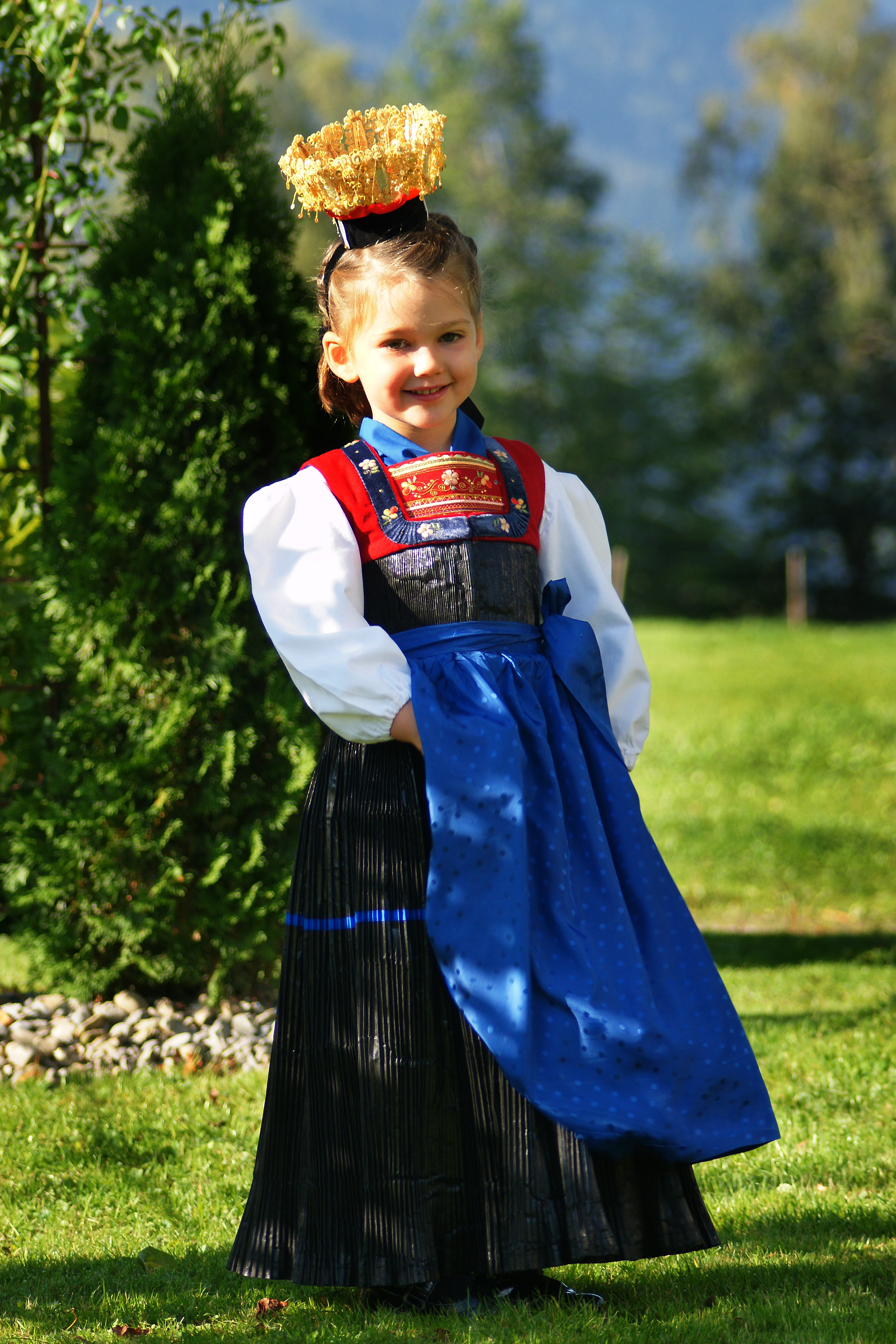
A young girl wearing a Juppe with the traditional festive crown

The Bregenz Forest traditional costume, locally called Juppe after the pleated skirt, the main component of the costume, is a women's traditional costume from the Bregenz Forest, a region in the western Austrian state of Vorarlberg. In its original form, the oldest traditional costume in the Alpine region. The history of the Juppe goes back to the late 15th century. The traditional costume is worn by women on festive occasions, such as for weddings, and on Sundays for mass in church. The elaborately embroidered traditional costume, as well as its multitude of accessories, is individually tailored by hand in the Juppenwerkstatt Riefensberg. The precious garment often accompanies the Bregenzerwald woman throughout her life and is usually passed down in the family. A striking feature of the traditional costume is the glued pleated skirt, which has 500 to 600 pleats.

The Juppe and its production in the municipality of Riefensberg was recognized and registered as Intangible Cultural Heritage of Austria by UNESCO in 2021.

== History and Legend ==
In the late 15th century, the skirt characteristic of the costume was made of raw linen folded several times, which became white through repeated washing.

A legend tells that during the Thirty Years' War, Bregenzerwald women armed with pitchforks put to flight or even defeated a Swedish army in the "Battle of the Women of Egg" because they were mistaken for "heavenly beings" by the attackers because of their white clothing. As a result, they are said to have sworn to wear only dark clothes in the future, since white ones were reserved for the heavenly. The women are said to have discarded their bloodstained white costumes after the battle and henceforth wore only black.

In fact, from the 17th to the middle of the 18th century, skirts were dyed brown. Due to the influence of Spanish fashion, black Juppes became more popular, which are still the most commonly worn today. The brown Juppe is called Wilfling, the white Juppe is called Schwedenjuppe (Swedish Juppe) according to the legend.

== Production ==
The Juppe is the pleated skirt and the main component of the women's costume of the Bregenz Forest. "Jupe" is the French word for skirt. The production of a Juppe is labor-intensive: the production of the deep black pleated fabric made of shiny linen takes place in Riefensberg. It is made in four steps by hand: dyeing the fabric, gluing it with leather glue, giving it a shine and pleating it 500 to 600 times which is fixed at the waistband and with a sewn-on blue fabric strip. The gluing gives the fabric a very smooth and hard structure, which is why the pleated skirt cannot be folded for storage, but must be rolled up and hung in the closet. The Juppe has hardly changed over the centuries.
