= Bregenz Forest =

Region in Vorarlberg, Austria

Bregenzerwald
- Bregenzerwald
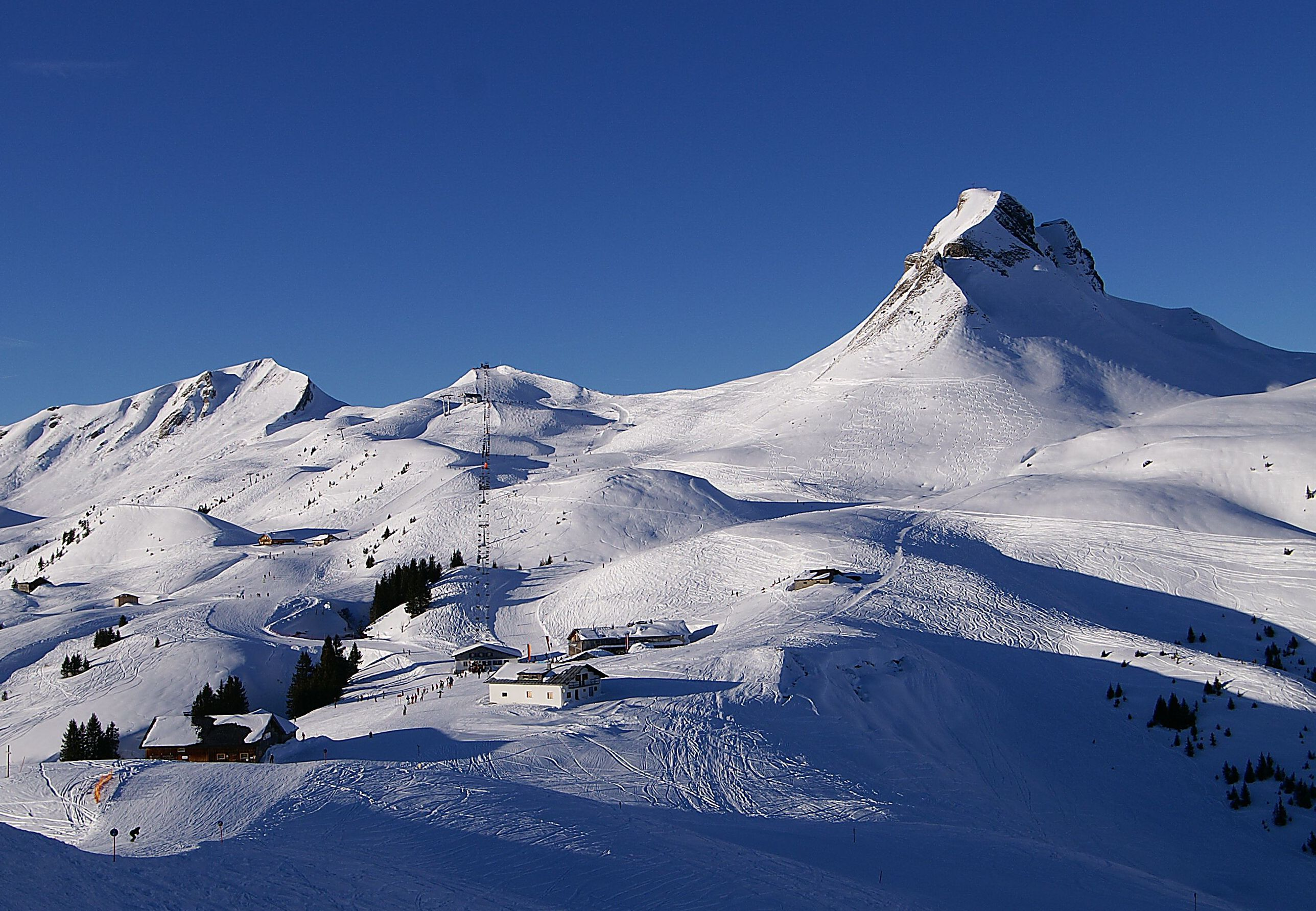
- Damülser Mittagspitze, 2,095m

Highest point
- Peak: Glatthorn
- Elevation: 2,134 m (7,001 ft)
- Coordinates: 47°15′56″N 9°52′48″E

Geography
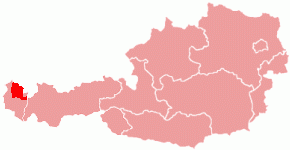
- Bregenzerwald region within Austria
- Country: Austria
- States: Vorarlberg
- Parent range: Northern Limestone Alps

The Bregenzerwald (German: Bregenzerwald, pronounced [ˈbʁeːɡɛnt͡sɐˌvalt]) is one of the main regions in the state of Vorarlberg (Austria). It overlaps, but is not coterminous with, the Bregenz Forest Mountains, which belong to a range of the Northern Limestone Alps, specifically the northern flysch zone. It is the drainage basin of the Bregenzer Ach river and has a population of 31.386 (as of Sep 2024).

== Geography ==
Bregenz Forest borders the Lake Constance region in the Rhine Valley to the west, Germany and Bavaria (Lindau and Oberallgäu districts) to the north, the Kleinwalsertal valley to the northeast, the Hochtannberg region at Tannberg to the east and the Großes Walsertal valley to the south. It borders the Leiblachtal valley to the northwest and the Laternsertal valley to the southwest, which can be reached via the Furkajoch.

Regional inhabitants often divide Bregenz Forest into two main areas, the Vorderwald ('Lower Bregenz Forest') and Hinterwald ('Upper Bregenz Forest'). The Vorderwald, with its hills and low mountains, is closest to the Rhine valley. The taller mountains are in Hinterwald, with altitudes of up to 2,000 metres. The two regions have distinctive dialect variations.

=== Villages ===
Municipalities of the Bregenzerwald

For historical reasons, the market town of Bezau is considered the main town in Bregenz Forest, although the market town of Egg and the municipalities of Alberschwende and Andelsbuch are larger in terms of population.

Although the municipalities of Langen and Buch are located in the Lake Constance-Vorarlberg region (Rhine Valley), they are still part of the Bregenz Forest Käsestrasse (Cheese Route), for example.

The municipalities of Egg, Andelsbuch and Schwarzenberg are also often referred to as Mittelbregenzerwald (Mid Bregenz Forest).

The court district of Bezau does not completely coincide with the Bregenz Forest region: Alberschwende, Doren, Riefensberg and Sulzberg are subject to the court district of Bregenz, but the small Walsertal valley belongs to the Bezau court. Warth is already part of the Hochtannberg region, but is also partly included in Bregen Forest.

Lower Bregenz Forest (Vorderer Bregenzerwald) (red)

1. Alberschwende
2. Doren
3. Sulzberg
4. Langenegg
5. Krumbach
6. Riefensberg
7. Lingenau
8. Hittisau
9. Sibratsgfäll

Upper Bregenz Forest (Hinterer Bregenzerwald) (blue)

1. Egg
2. Andelsbuch
3. Schwarzenberg
4. Bezau
5. Reuthe
6. Bizau
7. Mellau
8. Schnepfau
9. Au
10. Damüls
11. Schoppernau
12. Schröcken
13. Warth

=== Nature reserves ===
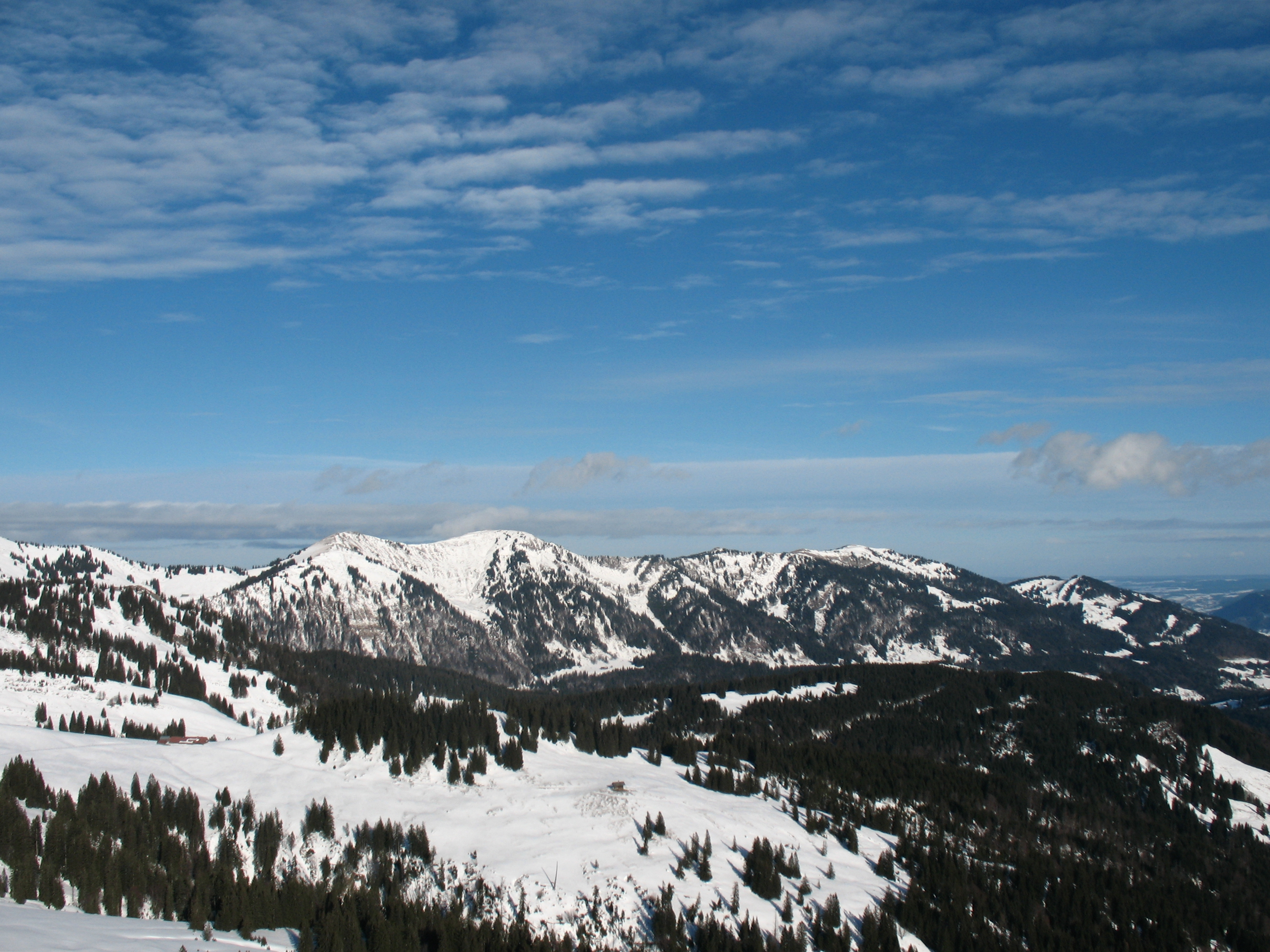
The Eastern part of the Nagelfluhkette

The Nagelfluhkette Nature Park is the first cross-border nature park between Germany and Austria and is therefore an international pilot project. It is 48,000ha in size, comprises ten Bavarian and eight Vorarlberg municipalities and forms the transition between the Allgäu and the Bregenzerwald. Nagelfluh is a conglomerate of round rocks that were compressed over 25 million years.

The Großes Walsertal Biosphere Reserve covers 19,231 ha. The biosphere reserve has been part of UNESCO since November 2000 and is Vorarlberg's first UNESCO reserve. It strives for a sustainable economy and tourism in the region and provides a platform for discussion about sustainability, society and politics. Of about 180 farms in the reserve, about 42 percent are organic farms.

The following European protected areas are partially or completely located in Bregenz Forest:

- Bregenzerachschlucht
- Witmoos (Langen/Bregenz)
- Kanisfluh (Au, Mellau, Schnepfau)
- Fohramoos (Schwarzenberg)
- Unterargenstein (Au)
- Unter Stellerhöhe (Egg)
- Unter der Winterstaude (Egg)
- Widdersteinmähder (Warth)
- Ifen (Egg, Mittelberg, Sibratsgfäll)
- Hochifen and Gottesackerplateau (Bezau, Egg, Mittelberg)
- Rossbad (Krumbach)
- Hirschberg (Langen bei Bregenz)
- Farnacher Moos (Alberschwende, Bildstein)
- Kojen-Moos (Riefensberg)
- Hohe Kugel – Hoher Freschen – Mellental (Mellau and Rheinvalley villages)
- Auer Ried (Au)
- Körbersee (Schröcken)

== History ==
Around the year 1000, Bregenz Forest, which was still completely forested at the time, was settled and cultivated from Bregenz via the Schneiderkopf and the Lorena mountains (Buch, Bildstein, Alberschwende). The highest areas, on the other hand, were settled in the late Middle Ages by Walsers who came from the Grisons or originally from the Valais.

While the northern parts of Bregenz Forest (the courts of Alberschwende, Lingenau and Sulzberg) belonged to the lordship of Bregenz, the courts of Damüls and Innerbregenzerwald were part of the lordship of Feldkirch. This division, which took place in 1338, is the basis for the distinction between the front and rear Bregenzerwald that is still common today.

In 1390, with the sale of the county of Feldkirch, the Innerbregenzerwald and Damüls fell to Austria, followed by the courts of Lingenau and Alberschwende in 1451. The Tannberg with the Bregenzerwald communities of Schröcken and Warth became Austrian in 1453, and in 1523 the Habsburgs also acquired the court of Sulzberg.

=== Peasant Republic ===
After 1380, especially in the Inner Bregenz Forest, the peasantry of the forest formed a self-government (so-called peasant republic), with its own free rural community, its own constitution and high - and blood jurisdiction. A Landammann, usually from the most respected families in Bregenz Forest, was elected as the head of the community. Many of the well-known names that originally came from Bregenz Forest, e.g. Feurstein, Meusburger, Metzler, are depicted with their coats of arms on the surviving Landammann board.

The Landammann was appointed by free election and his town hall stood on the Bezegg between Bezau and Andelsbuch. Today, the Bezegg-Sul, a stone pillar, is a reminder of the former town hall.

The existence of the peasant republic is confirmed in the tradition of the Capuchin priest Stanislaus Saurbeck (1595-1647): Bregenz Forest was still "a long undeveloped wilderness" at the beginning of the 17th century, which "already had a bad reputation" in the chronicles of the 16th century:

=== Missionization ===
The chroniclers explain the "(low) level of moral and religious life" of the inhabitants, "although they were descended from Catholic parents", with customs and traditions from "pagan ancestors", which they had retained like a "blatant superstition. As crude, wild and immoral as they were in their behavior, the women in particular are said to have been just as shameless and angry in their dress."

"A thorough renewal and moral transformation in the whole of Bregenzerwald" only took place on the initiative of Father Stanislaus: the Capuchins "in their insatiable thirst for souls hurried from hut to hut, from village to village, instructing the people through conversations, Christian teachings and sermons, not resting or resting until the ice cover broke and the rough and cold minds became warm."

As a further consequence of missionization, "a small Capuchin monastery was founded in the valley. On July 12, 1655, the abbot of Mehrerau, Heinrich Amberg, laid the foundation stone for the monastery building [in Bezau], and on October 22, 1656, the monastery church was consecrated by Prince-Bishop Johann von Praßberg."

The last subordination, that to Mehrerau Abbey, was dissolved in 1658 – 190 years before the peasants' liberation of 1848.

In contrast to most farmers of the time, Bregenz Forest people were able to settle anywhere as free men. There are numerous names, especially in Swabian, that can be traced back to Bregenz Forest.

The peasant constitution was abolished during the French Wars and was not reintroduced afterwards. At the beginning of the 20th century, there were still countless alps and farms where agriculture, livestock farming and cheese production were practiced. Numerous alps are still farmed today, but fewer and fewer farmers are doing so.

Until around 1900, many children from Bregenz Forest had to go to Swabia in Baden-Württemberg (Germany) from May to October to work on farms there. This meant that their parents had one less child to feed during the summer. These children became known as the Swabian children.

A Bregenz Forest house can be seen on the reverse side of the 100 schilling banknote from 1970.

== Cheese dairy ==
Cheese-making has a long tradition in Bregenz Forest. The Celts first brought cattle breeding and alpine farming to the region. The Romans occupied the region from 15 BC. They were already practising professional alpine cheese-making and passed on the knowledge of cheese-making to the Alemanni in the 5th century, who cleared a lot of forest for pasture farming and established communal pastures (Allmenden). In the 9th century, markets were regularly held in and around Bregenz Forest during church festivals, where cheese and lard were traded. The monasteries were involved in cheese production.

From around 1594, the "Schwarzenberg Market" was held once a year, where cattle and cheese were traded. Until the second half of the 17th century, only sour cheese dairies (the milk was completely skimmed) were operated in Bregenz Forest, where a lot of butter could also be produced. Butter production was very important as taxes had to be paid to the authorities in the form of butter.

After the Thirty Years' War, from around 1648, dairymen from Appenzell came to Bregenz Forest and taught the locals how to milk fat (the milk is not or only partially skimmed). Some of them leased alps and also set up dairies themselves. The spread of fat dairying is due to the fact that people in the less favorable climatic valleys had to build up durable food stocks for winter and times of need.

In the 18th century, a large proportion of alpine milk was already being processed into alpine cheese.

At the beginning of the 18th century, there was a ban on fat dairying, which resulted in uprisings by the people of the Bregenzerwald. The farmers prevailed and thus began the upswing of Bregenz Forest hard cheese making. The production of sour cheese gradually declined. It was mostly only used for personal consumption and for sale within the region. In 1785, the first roads were built in as a strong trading activity developed. The first iron-shod wagons appeared in 1786.

Schwarzenberg has been the most important trading center for cheese in Bregenz Forest since 1816. The cuboid brick cheese and a Swiss Emmental imitation were transported in carriages to the Danube Monarchy, including Italy and Greece. The first municipal dairy was built in Au in 1830.

The second half of the 19th century was the time of the so-called "cheese counts". Even back then, milk and cheese production was an important source of income for farmers. The cheese counts were a few influential cheese merchants with a monopoly position. They bought milk and cheese and took care of the marketing, while the majority of farmers lived in poverty. The most famous cheese count was Gallus Moosbrugger. To alleviate the plight of the farmers, the farmer and social reformer Franz Michael Felder (1839-1869) founded a cheese trading association and a cattle insurance company.

In 1900, an imperial and royal school for cheese-making was opened in Doren.

Since 1993, the Vorarlberg Cheese Awards have been held annually in September in Schwarzenberg. Around 100 dairies and alpine dairies compete with 170 products for the award for the best cheese in the categories of alpine cheese, mountain cheese and semi-hard cheese made from hay milk (silage-free milk).

The Bregenzerwald Cheese Route ("Käsestraße")was founded in 1998. It is a cooperation of farmers and innkeepers, craftsmen and tourism in Bregenz Forest. The member businesses hope to preserve the regional cultural and natural landscape and promote the production and marketing of regional products among themselves and with each other. The KäseStraße is a project of the regional funding program LEADER II of the European Union.

To this day, Bregenz Forest is known for its cheese. More than 1,322 agricultural farms with 12,446 cows produce over 50 million kilograms of milk per year.

== Culture ==
=== Dialect ===
Until 1814, parts of the Allgäu in the north and north-west belonged to Vorarlberg. Since the entire region was settled by the Alemanni, the Lake Constance Alemannic dialect became predominant beginning in the 5th and 6th centuries. Over the centuries there was a brisk trading of goods which, with the increased extension of marriages and family networks, led to a linguistic intermingling. Especially in the "Vorderwald" the influence of the Allgäu dialect is particularly noticeable. By contrast, in the Mittelwald and Hinterwald regions the predominant language forms show a stronger connection with the Hofsteig region and Dornbirn. Speakers outside of the Bregenzer Wald region perceive (Wälderisch) as an idiom of its own. However, there is no uniform Vorarlbergisch dialect; there are considerable local and regional variations. The official language in Vorarlberg is, of course, High German (Hochdeutsch).

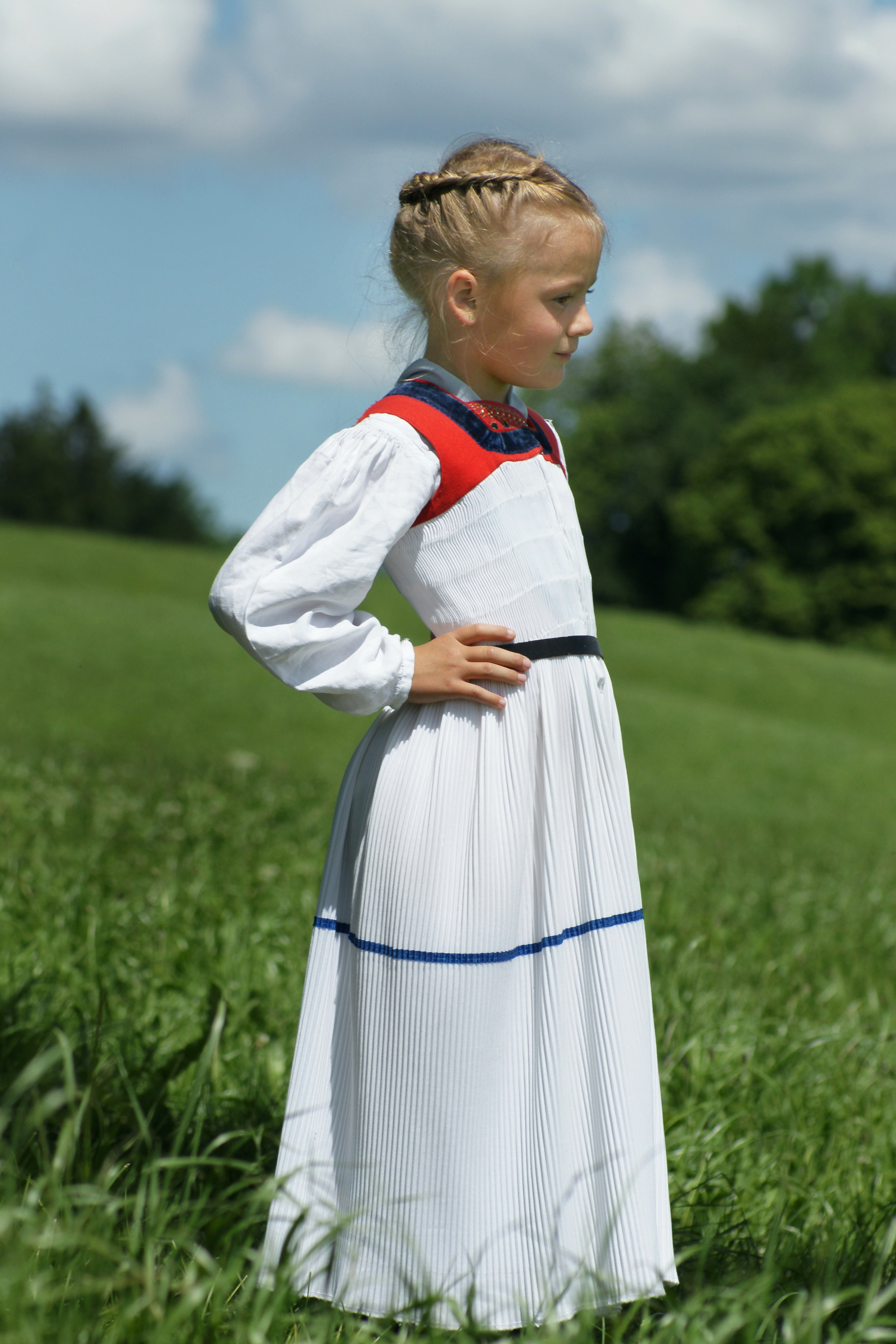
Girl in a white Juppe

=== Bregenz Forest tracht ===
Traditional costumes ("tracht") have a long history in Vorarlberg. Many valleys and villages have their own kind of garb, each with special characteristics from certain style periods. The Bregenzerwälder garb is the oldest of its kind in the Alpine region. It originated in the 15/16th century. The Bregenzerwälder tracht for women is called "d'Juppô" (Bavarian: "Juppe").

The Bregenz Forest is the only Austrian tracht region where there is a craftswoman for every detail of the costume: milliners, seamstresses, embroiderers, weavers and goldsmiths for the belt buckles. One of the last places that still manufacture the Juppe in the traditional way is the Juppenwerkstatt Riefensberg.

=== Cuisine ===
The Bregenz Forest is well known for its dairy products. The Vorarlberger Bergkäse is a popular product from the region.

The various regional products and creations can also be sampled on culinary hikes. These walks through Bregenz Forest are organized by the tourism associations and take visitors for breakfast and lunch through a selection of different restaurants, all of which focus on Vorarlberg products and specialities.

The KäseStraße Bregenzerwald ("Cheese Road") is an association of farmers, dairymen, innkeepers, commercial enterprises and craftsmen, and is therefore not a road in a conventional sense.

Bregenz Forest mountain cheese is a specialty known far beyond the borders of the region. With around 180 members and numerous partners, KäseStrasse unites a host of experts from various disciplines for the pleasurable, beautiful and artistic under one roof. These include farmers and alpine pastures, alpine dairies and cheese makers, cheese inns and restaurants, museums, railroads, tourist offices, and numerous partner companies from the craft and trade sectors. Members and partners of the KäseStrasse help to preserve and promote the Bregenz Forest landscape, small-scale structures and local products.

=== Architecture ===
==== The Guild of Au (Baroque period) ====
The Auer Zunft (Guild of Au) was founded in Au by Michael Beer in 1651. It is an association of builders, sculptors and carpenters. In Au-Schoppernau from 1670 to 1700, more than 90 percent of all male workers were builders. Master builders and craftsmen from the Bregenz Forest in particular, but also from other parts of today's Vorarlberg, played a leading role in the 600 churches and monasteries that were built in the Baroque style in the 17th and 18th centuries. Members of the Guild of Au received 60 percent of the more than 700 major construction contracts awarded to Vorarlbergers.

Many important members of the Guild of Au came from the architect families Beer, Moosbrugger and Thumb.

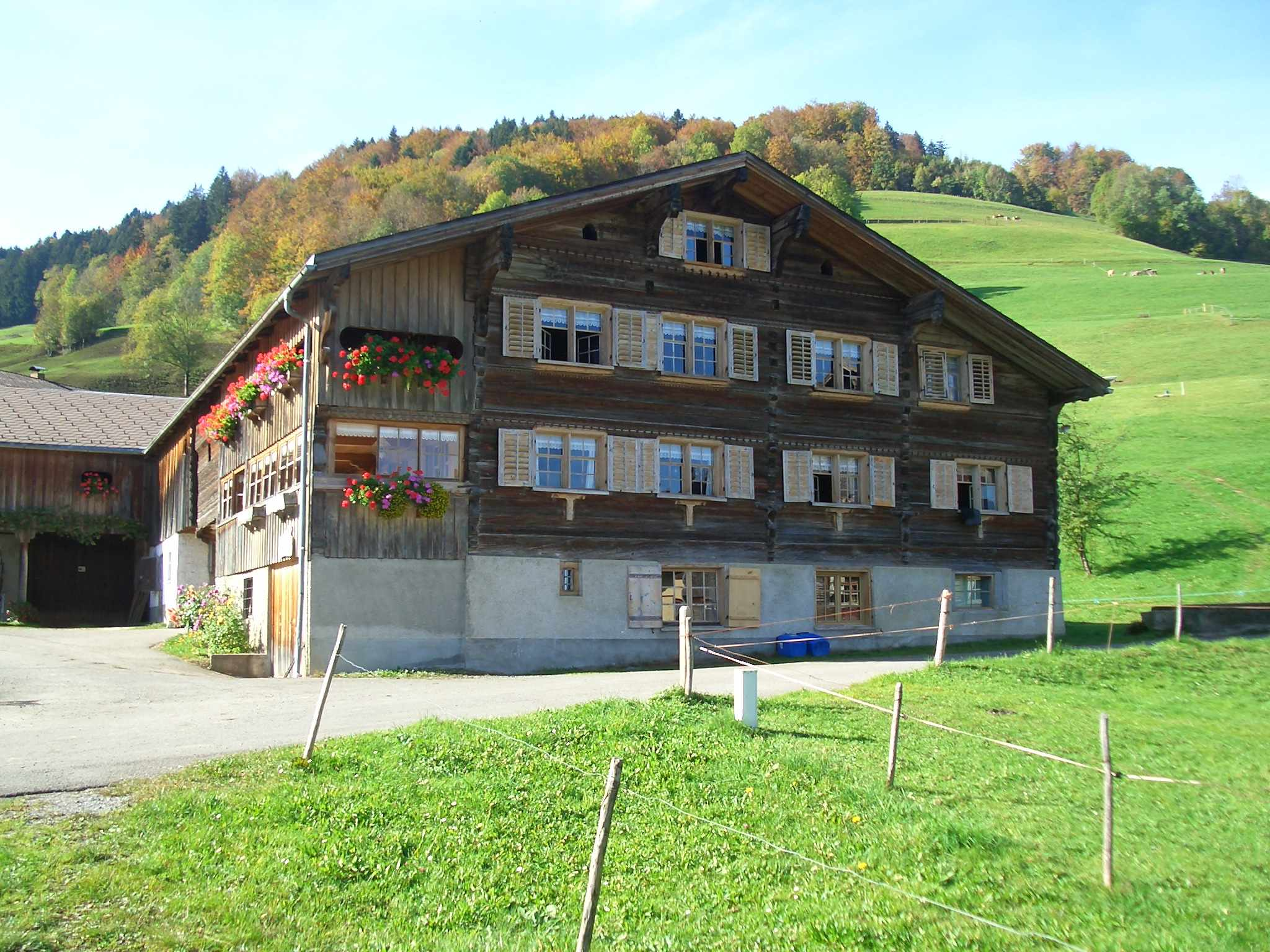
A Bregenzerwälderhaus in Schwarzenberg

==== Bregenzerwälderhaus ====
The Bregenzerwald house is particularly relevant for the historical architecture in the Bregenz Forest. These are built in a mixed stone-wood construction and characterize the landscape. The Bregenzerwälderhaus combines the residential building, the stable and the barn under one roof. The oldest houses of this type were built in the 15th century. In the centre of Schwarzenberg are a few well-preserved and relatively uniform Bregenzerwald houses, all built around the same time - after the great fire of 1755.

==== Modern and contemporary architecture ====
The Neue Vorarlberger Bauschule developed organically in the second half of the 20th century and always involved local craftsmen in the building process. With still recognizable typical Vorarlberg architecture, it combines tradition and modernity: clear lines, glass and local wood. Its harmonious mixture creates interesting contrasts like in half-timbered houses. Comfort and quality of life play a central role in the design of new houses in Vorarlberg. In many renovations of private homes and public buildings, local wood is preferred, which means that energy consumption can be minimised.

Well-known award-winning architectural projects are the Werkraum Haus in Andelsbuch (workroom house), Frauenmuseum Hittisau (women's museum), the Angelika Kauffmann Museum Schwarzenberg and the chapel Salgenreute in Krumbach.

In 2014, the modern architectural project BUS:STOP Krumbach was completed. When the municipality of Krumbach decided to rebuild seven bus stops in 2010, they hired seven international architects to design bus shelters. Local craftsmen executed their designs. While each stop differs in design, the bus stops are all meant to uniquely integrate architecture into the natural surroundings.

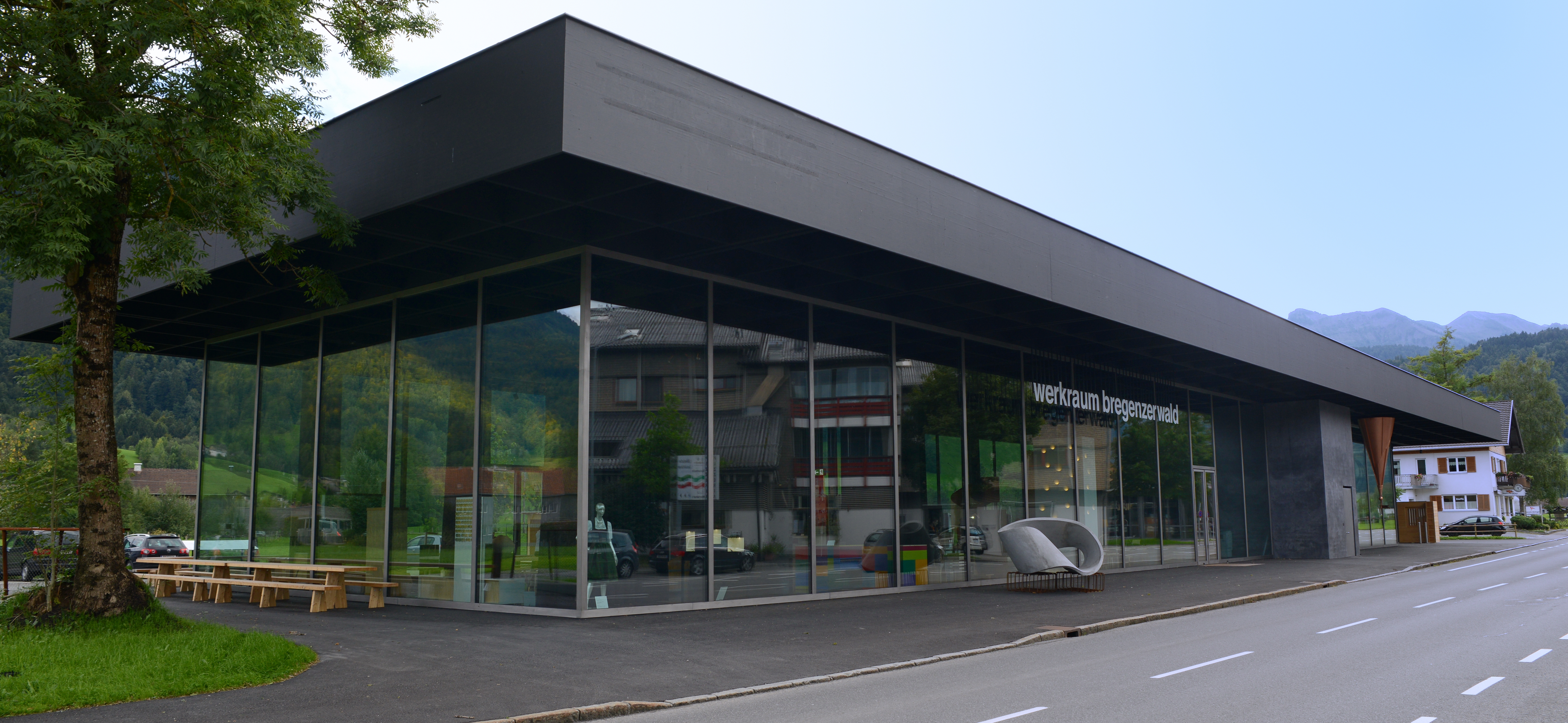
The Werkraumhaus was designed by Peter Zumthor and opened in 2015.

The Werkraum Bregenzerwald is an association of craftsmen in the Bregenz Forest founded in 1999. It aims at networking and supporting craft, design and technology businesses in the area. The publicly accessible place is used to present the craftsmanship, to promote building culture in cooperation with architects and to increase design competence and quality of craftsmanship with the preferred involvement of young people. The associated workshop building was designed by Peter Zumthor. The building was awarded the Austrian Builders' Prize (Österreichischer Bauherrenpreis) in 2014 and 2015.

== Museums and sights ==
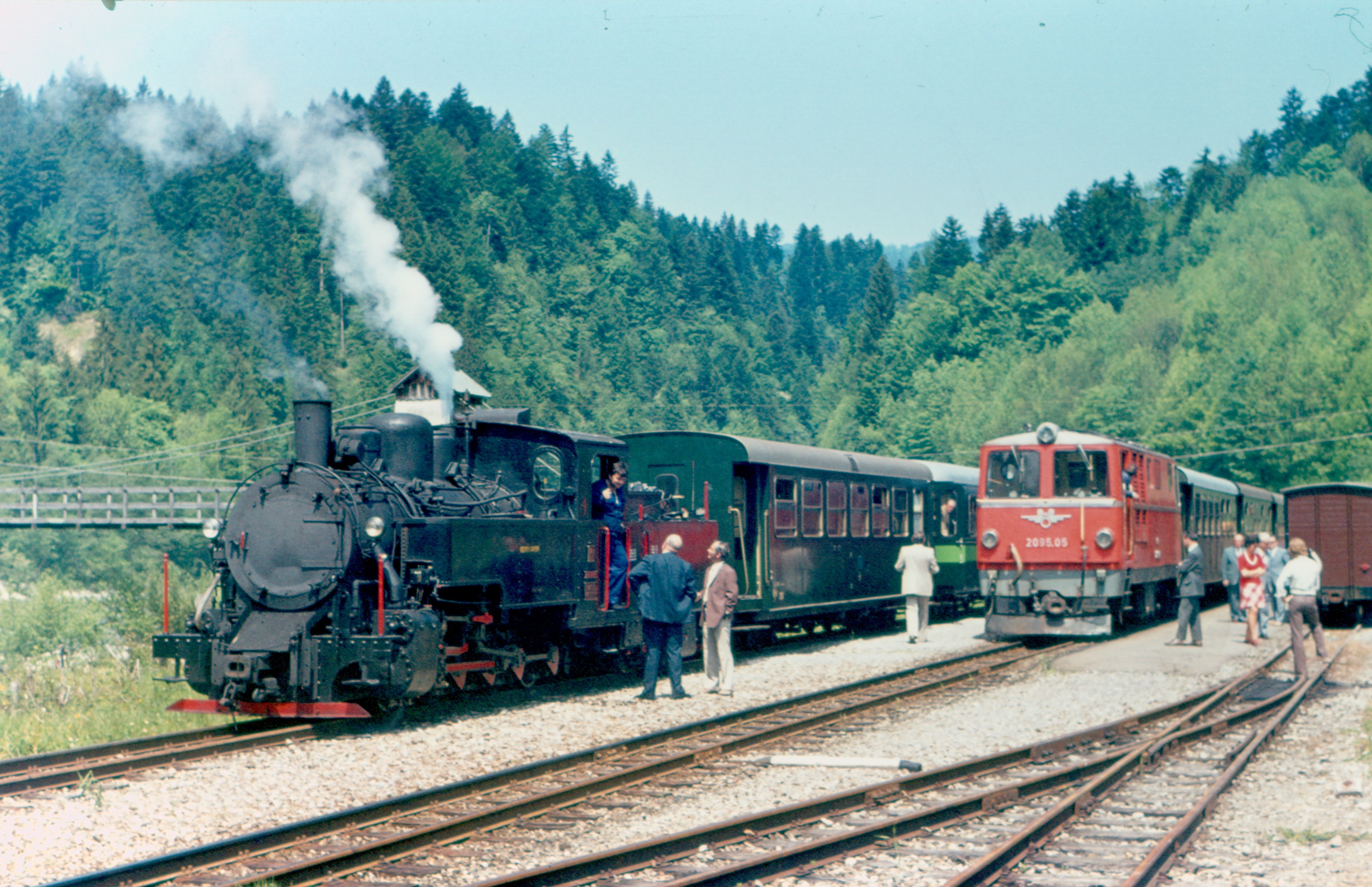
The Bregenz Forest Railway in 1974

The Schubertiade takes place annually in the summer in Schwarzenberg. At a Schubertiade, informal classical music is played and recited. The festival in Schwarzenberg focuses on compositions that are usually not played at larger concerts and may or may not be composed by Franz Schubert.

The Bregenzerwaldbahn ("'s Wälderbähnle") is a museum railway that runs on a remaining section of the narrow-gauge railway. From 1902 to 1983, the Wälderbähnle travelled the 35.5 km long route from Bregenz to Bezau. Until October 2004, a 6.1 km route was accessible, but a section had to give way to road construction. Today, a distance of 5 km from Bezau station via Reuthe to Schwarzenberg station is available.

In 2000, the Hittisau Women's Museum opened. It is the only museum of its kind in Austria. The museum is devoted to the display and documentation of the cultural works and stories of women, which deal with a broad variety of topics, including questions of female identity and gender roles.

The Angelika Kauffmann Museum in Schwarzenberg is dedicated to the painter Angelika Kauffmann.

The Bezau Museum is located in a listed Bregenz Forest farmhouse from the 18th century, which was extended by a modern annex planned by the architects Innauer Matt. It provides insights into the former living conditions in Bregenz Forest and is dedicated to women's crafts in Bregenz Forest and the Bezau Baroque master builders.

The Vorarlberg FIS Ski Museum is located in the former vicarage of Damüls and documents the history of skiing in Vorarlberg.

Other museums of the Bregenz Forest region are the Museum of Baroque Master Builders in Au, Alpine Dairy Museum in Hittisau, the Egg Village Museum in Egg and the Franz Michael Felder museum in Schoppernau.

== Economy ==
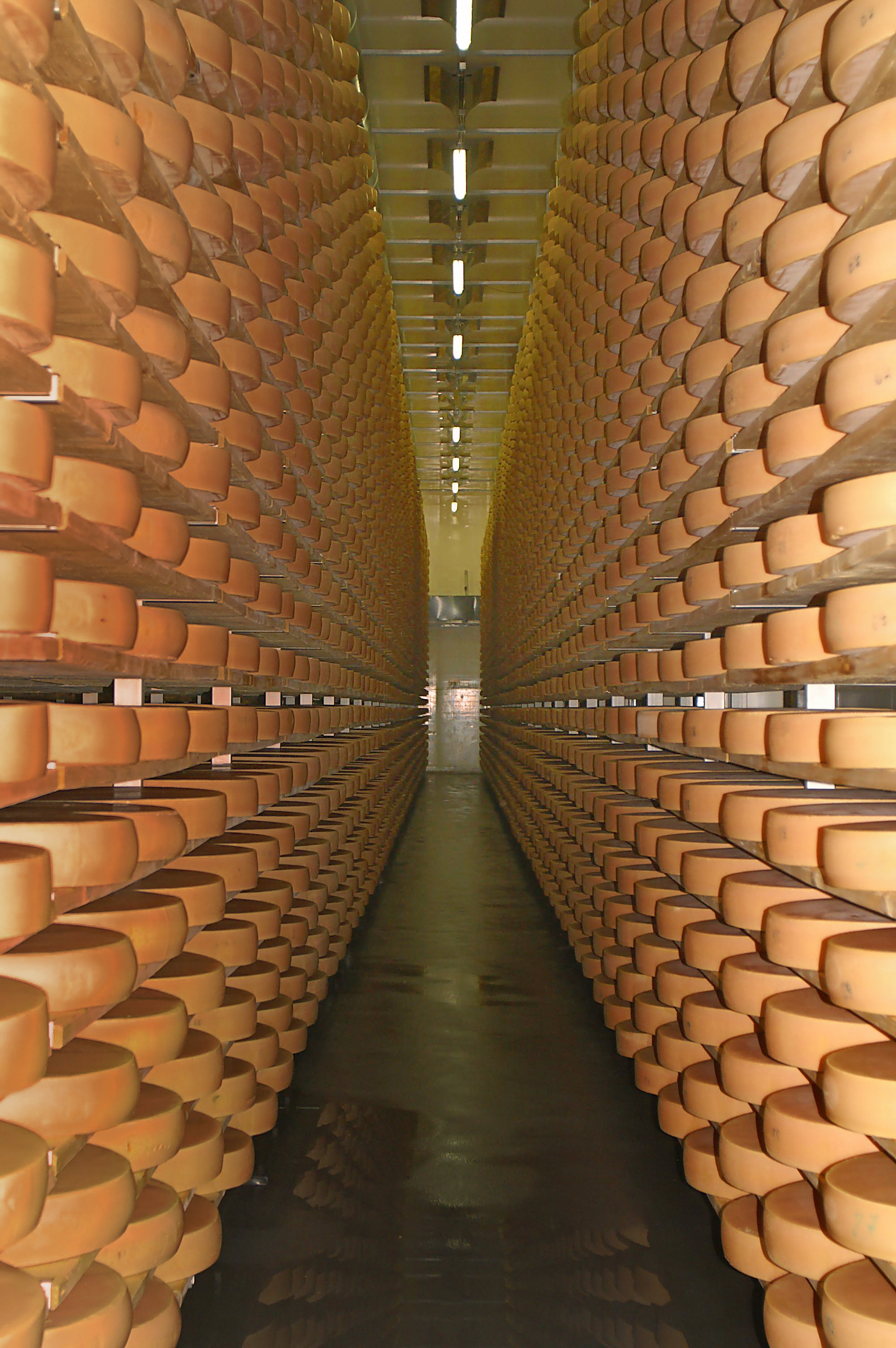
Dairy cellar in Lingenau

Residents of the Bregenz Forest earn their living primarily from summer and winter tourism, agriculture and especially the wood processing industry. Many locals also commute to work in the Rhine Valley, Vorarlberg's economic center.

=== Agriculture and Alpine transhumance ===
The Alpine transhumance or Alp farming is the basis of the traditional cheese making process in Vorarlberg. Farmers drive their livestock to where fodder is available. This means that they change stables several times a year depending on the season. In German, Alp farming is also called three-tier farming ("Dreistufenwirtschaft") because the pastures are managed in three tiers. In the spring of 2011, UNESCO declared the Alp farming in the Bregenzerwald to be an intangible cultural heritage.

The milk produced is then made into a variety of dairy products like Vorarlberger Bergkäse and sold in the valley dairies according to old tradition. Through traditional agriculture, the raw material milk is produced regionally and without silos.

The agricultural quota of the Bregenzerwald, i.e. the proportion of the population that derives its main income from agriculture, is extraordinarily high compared to the state of Vorarlberg, namely 7,8 % compare to 1,5 % (as of 2022). .

=== Tourism ===
Due to the great importance of tourism, the tertiary sector in the Bregenzerwald accounts for 50%. 11.2% of the working population works in the accommodation and catering sector. For comparison: the Vorarlberg average is 6.7% (as of 1991).

Guests who spend three or more nights in one of the 28 partner municipalities between May 1 and October 31 receive the free Bregenzerwald & Großes Walsertal Guest Card. It is valid for cable car rides, trips on public buses and visits to the outdoor pool. It is valid from the day of arrival to the day of departure and is issued by the hosts.

== Gallery ==
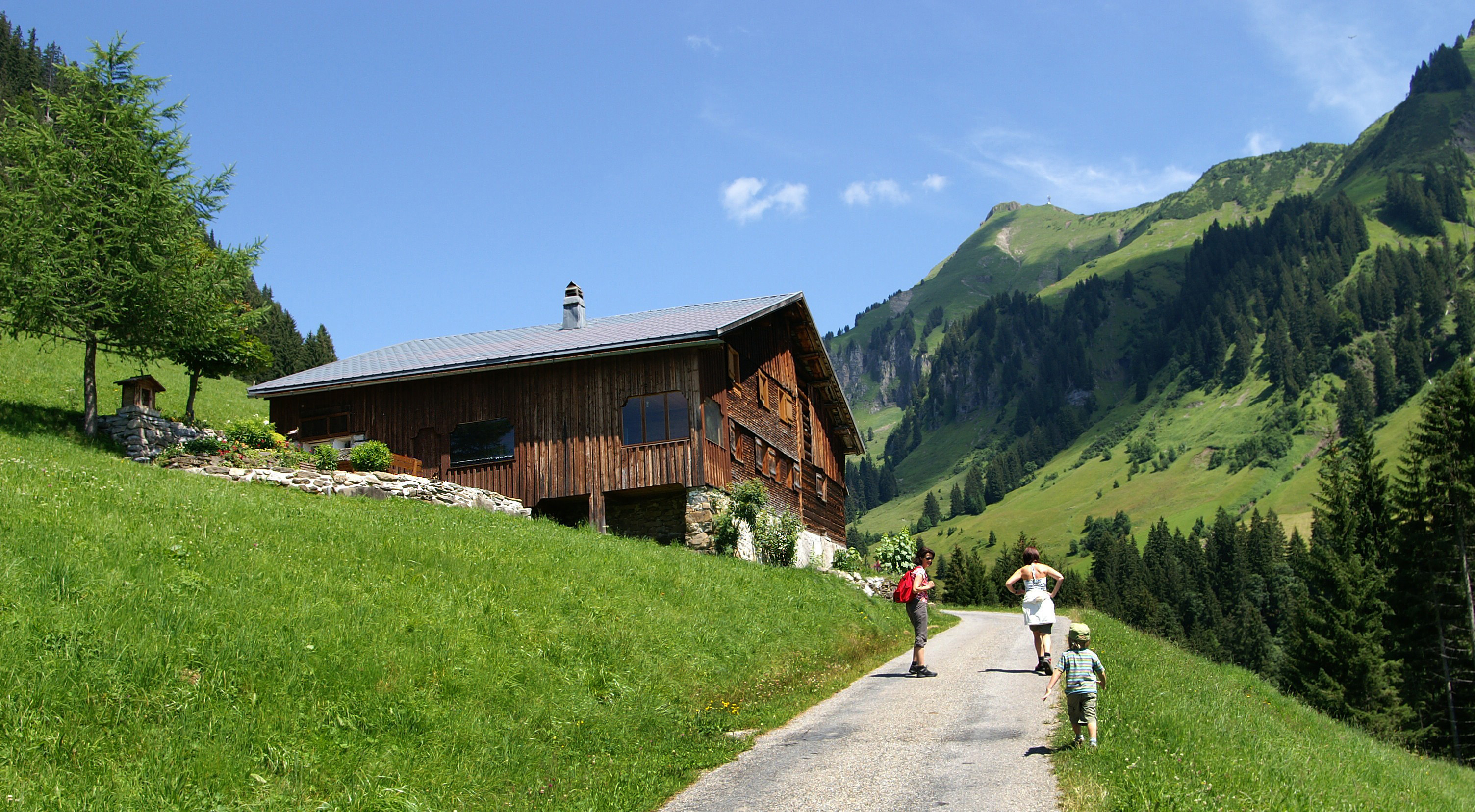
A Bregenzerwälderhaus on the Diedamskopf mountain

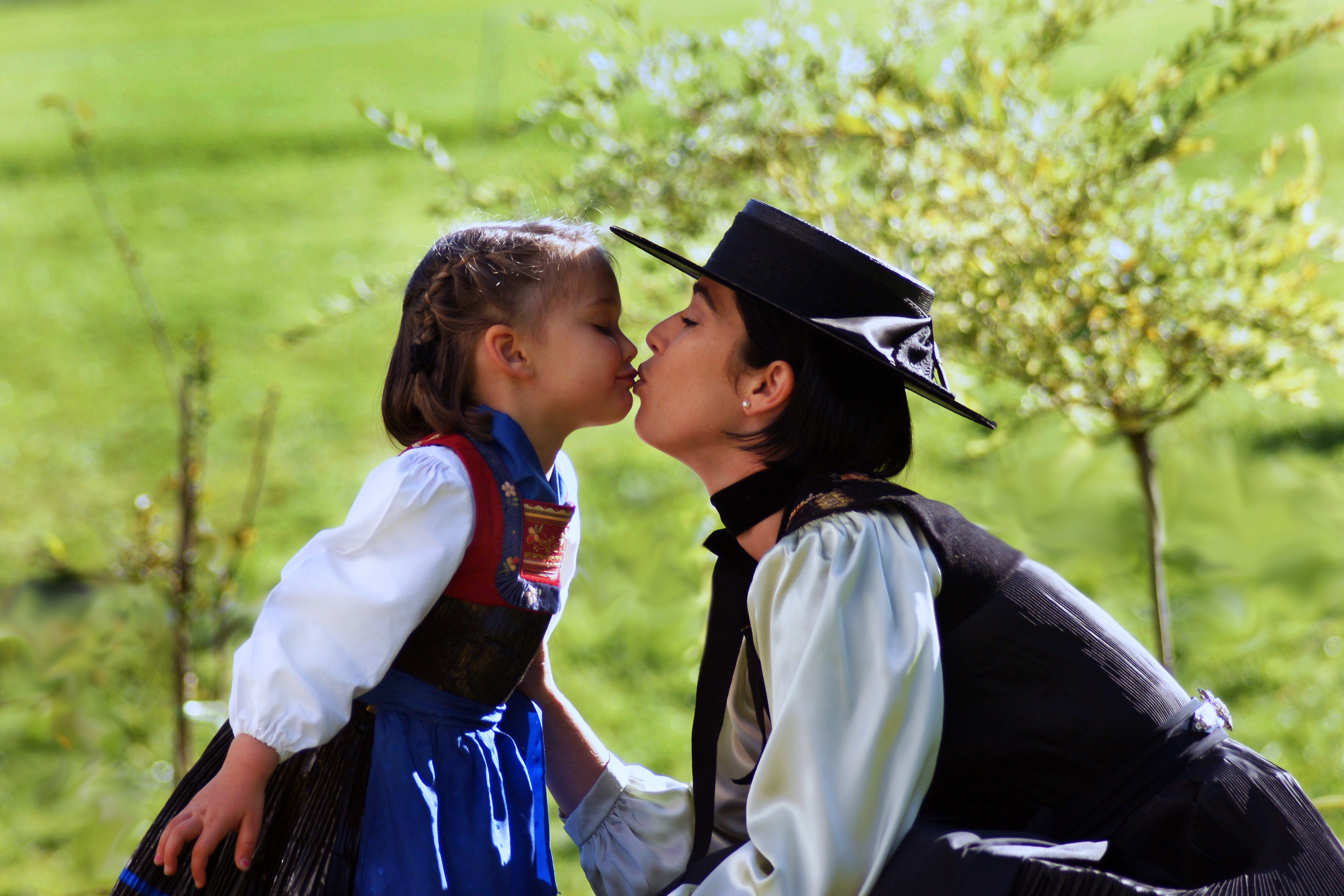
Mother and daughter in Bregenz Forest costume

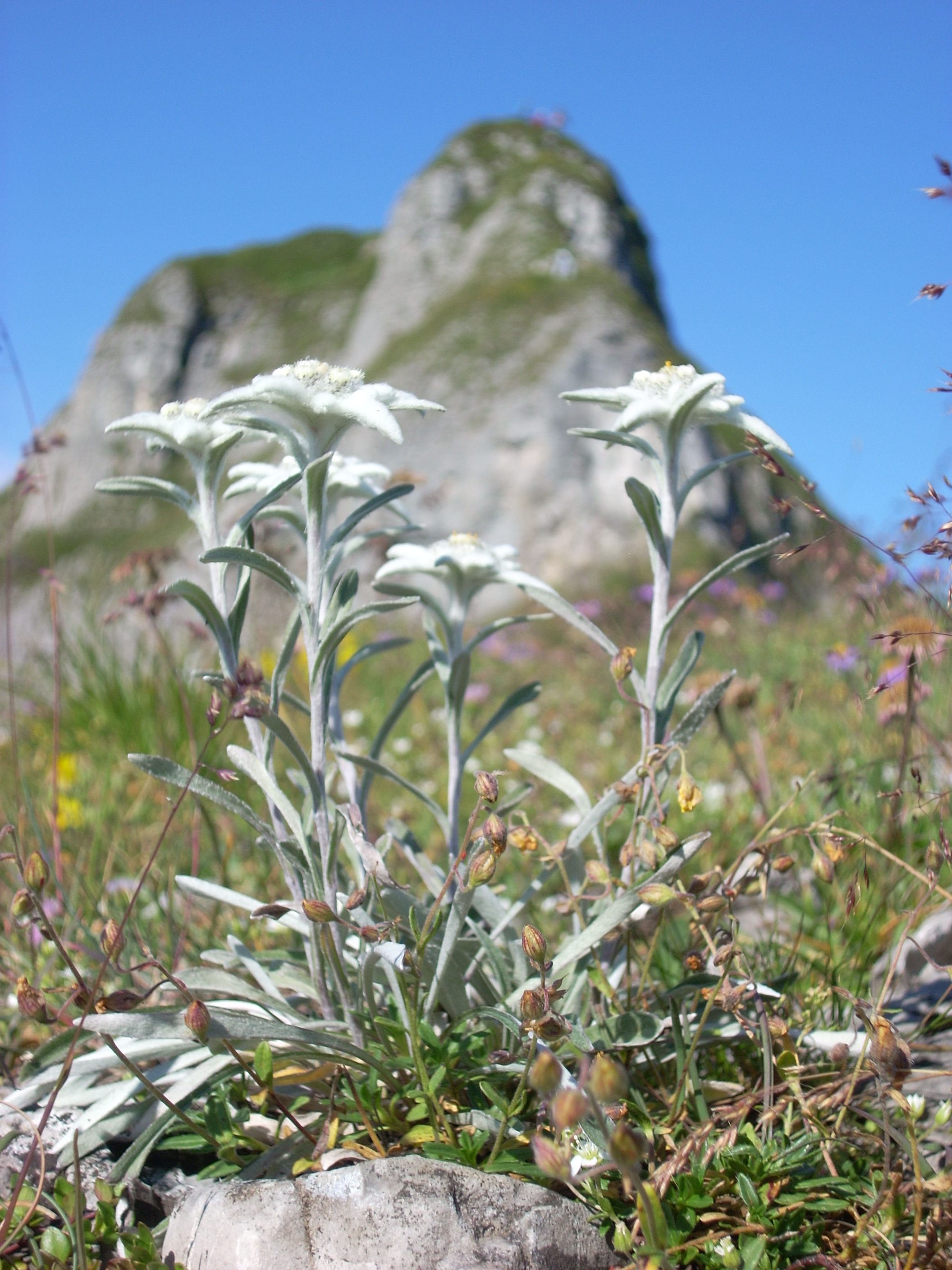
Edelweiss flower on the Kanisfluh

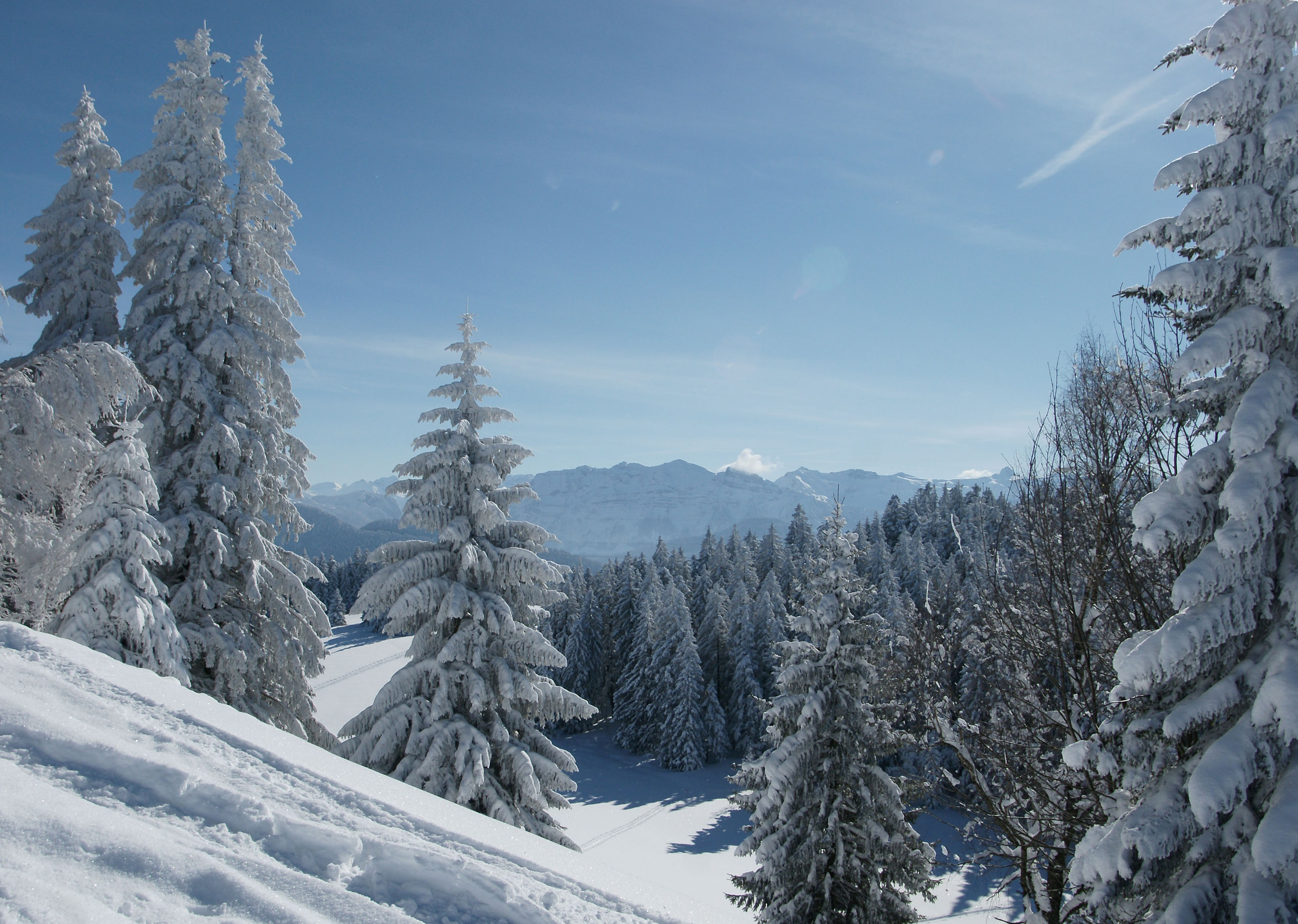
Spruce forest on the Brüggelekopf in Alberschwende. Between the trees, there are the Juppenspitze and the Mohnenfluh in Schröcken on the left and the northern flank of the Kanisfluh on the right.

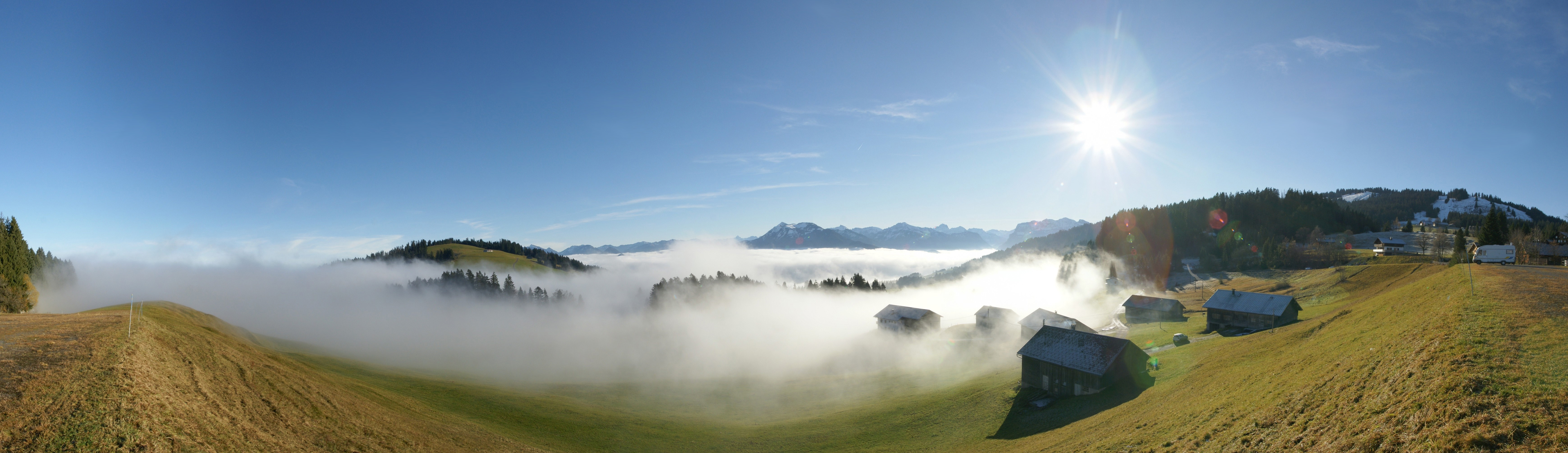
180° panorama on the Bödele, located between Dornbirn and Schwarzenberg

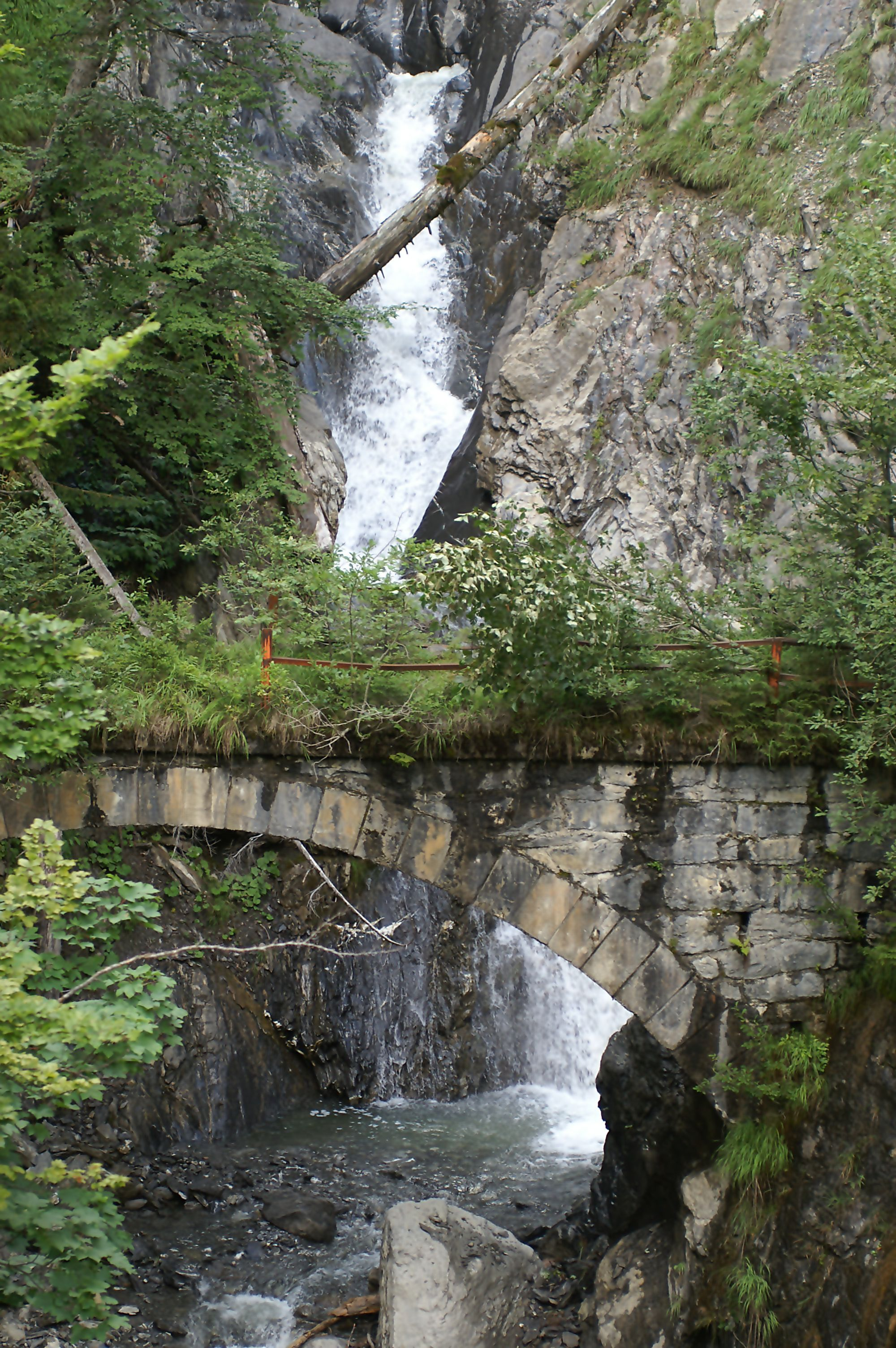
Bridge over the Mitteltobelbach of the old Faschina Straße (L193) from Au to Damüls

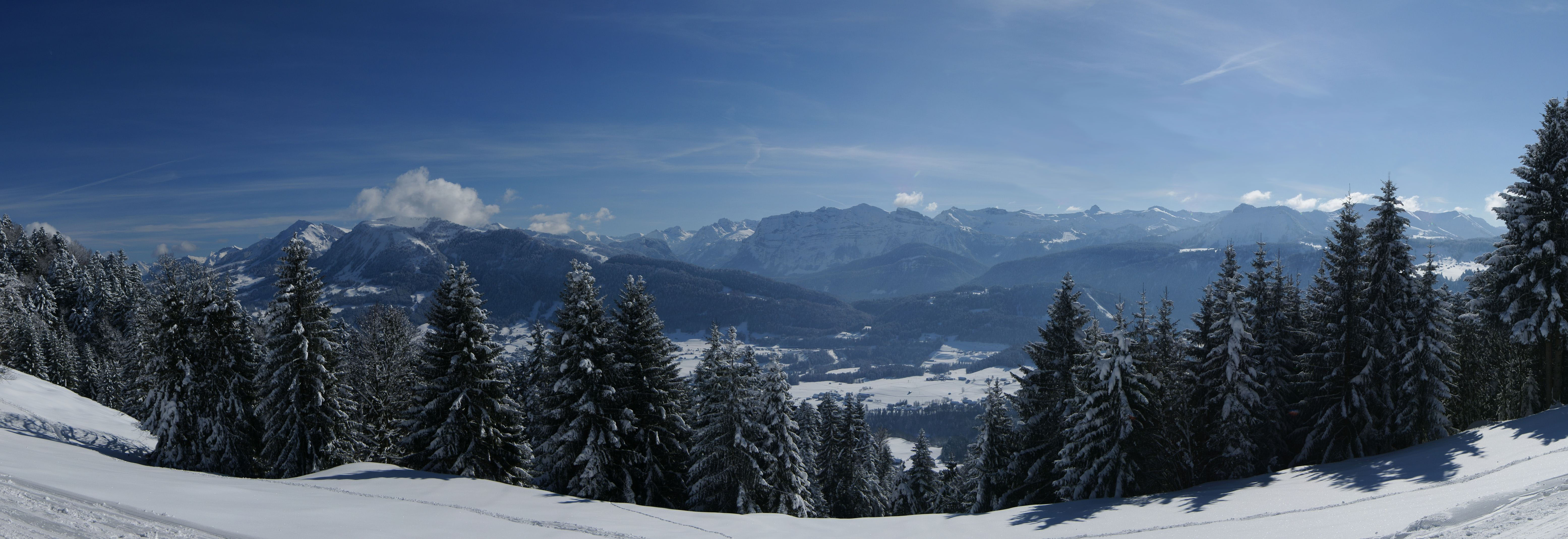
Mountain panorama with the dominant Kanisfluh in the centre

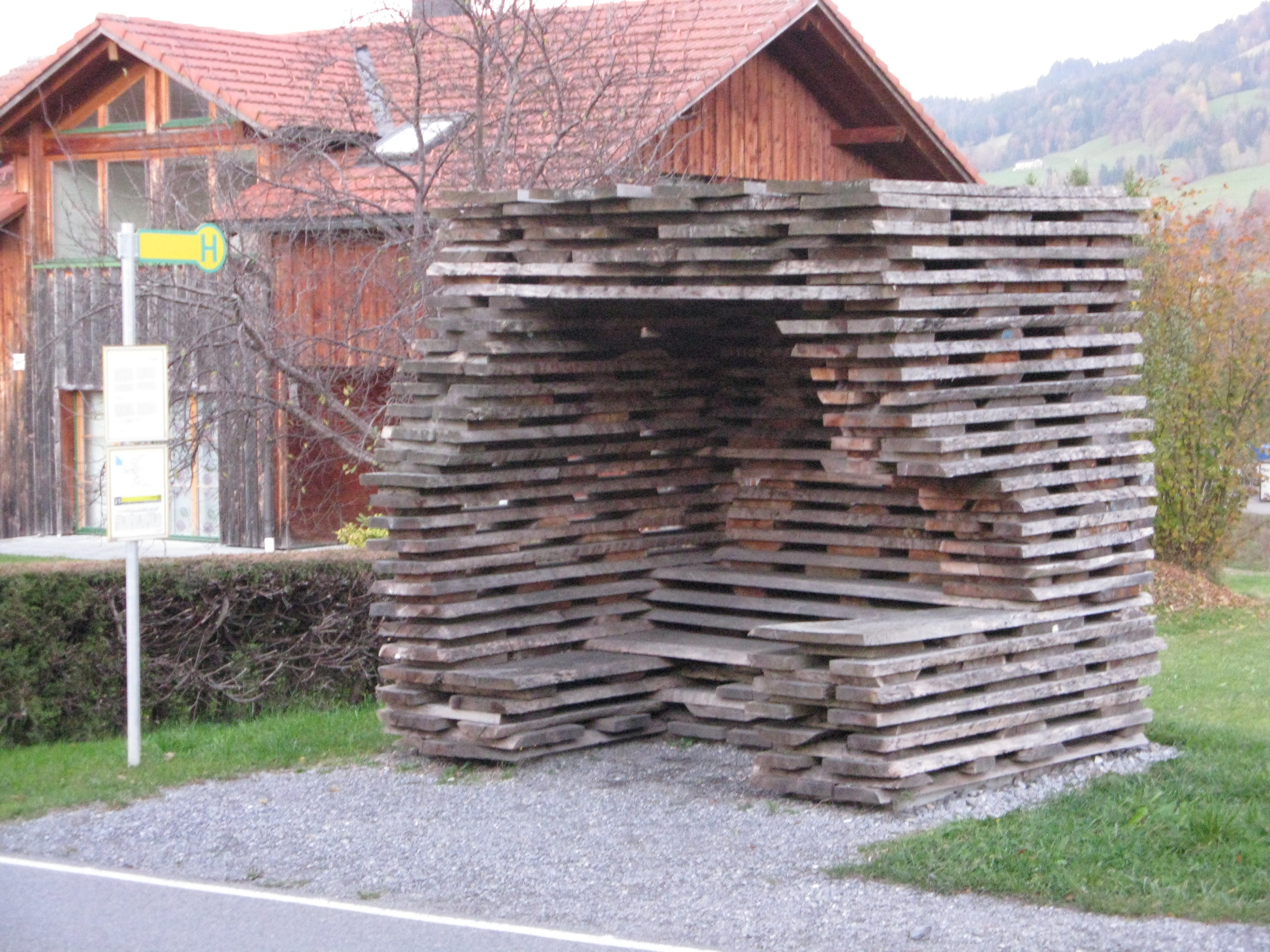
BUS:STOP no. 2 by Spanish architect Antón García Abril
