= BUS:STOP Krumbach =

Series of bus stops in Austria

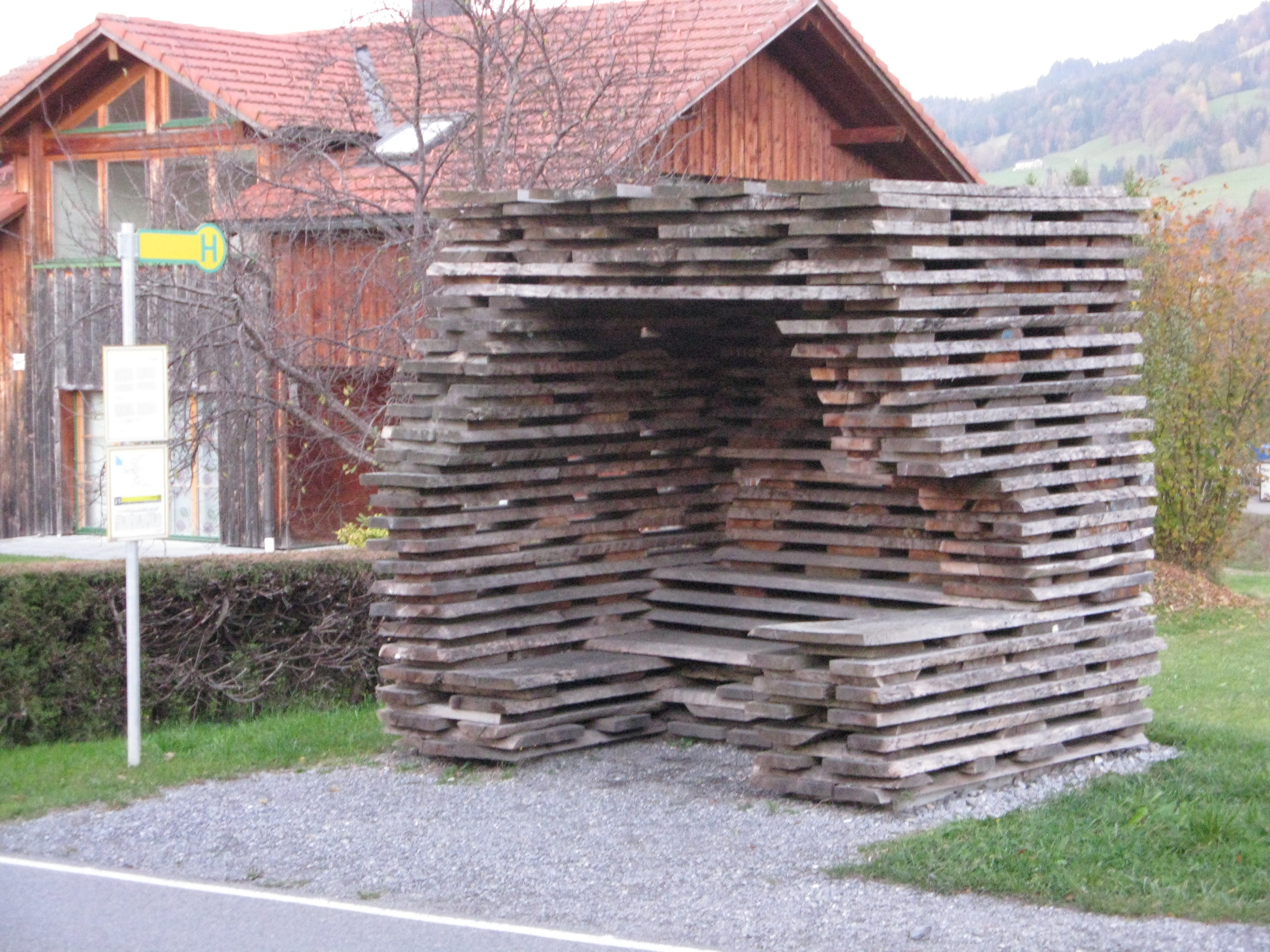
BUS:STOP no. 2 in Unterkrumbach Nord by Antón García-Abril (Ensamble Studio)

The BUS:STOP Krumbach is a construction project of seven bus stops in Krumbach in the Bregenz Forest in Vorarlberg (Austria).

== History ==
When it was decided in 2010 that the bus stops in Krumbach needed to be rebuilt, the director of the Architekturzentrum Wien, Dietmar Steiner, was commissioned to select seven international architects to design unusual bus stops. These were then manufactured and installed by local architects, local craftsmen and the community of Krumbach.

== Awards ==
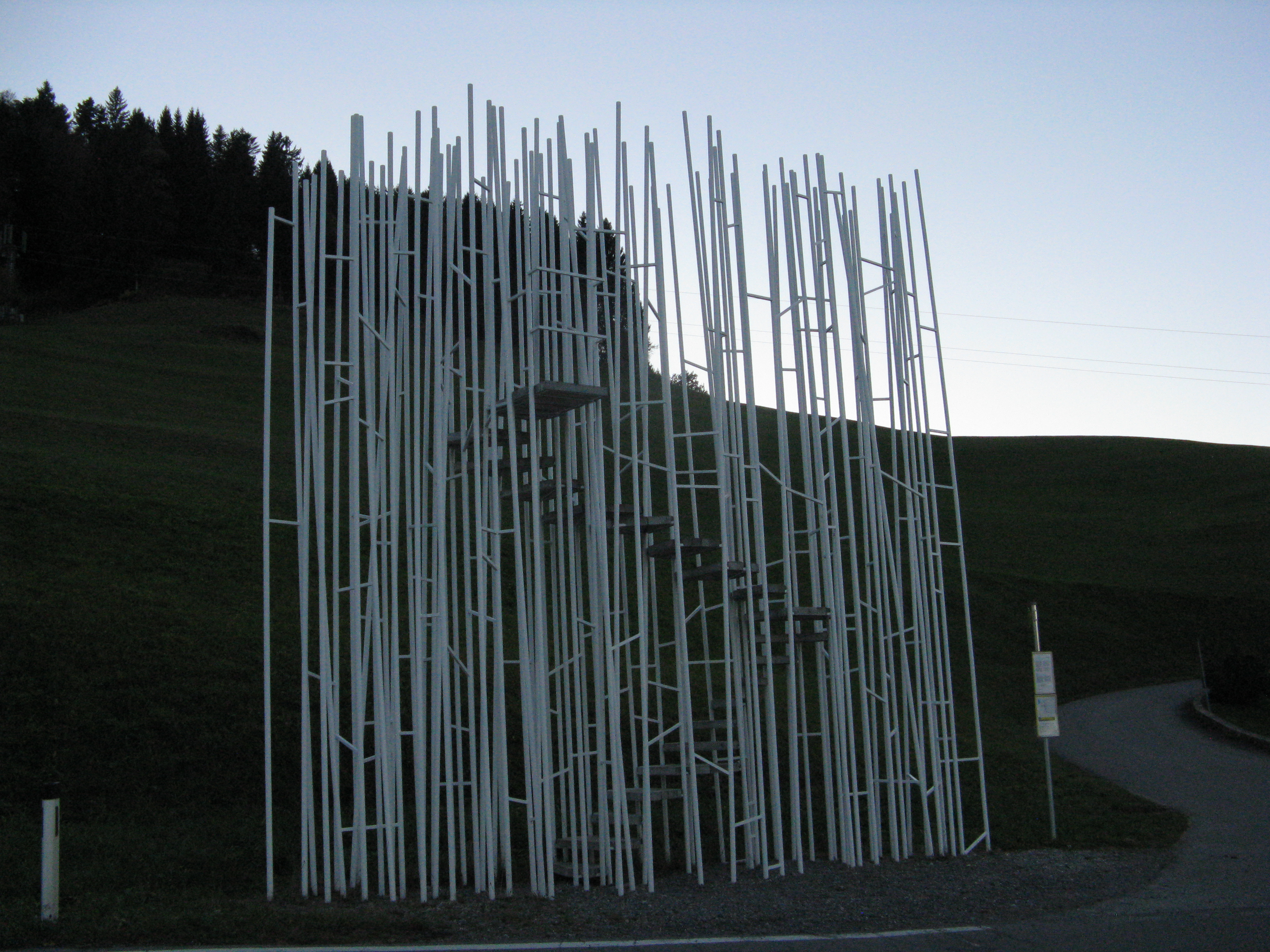
BUS:STOP no. 7 in Bränden by Sou Fujimoto

The BUS:STOP Krumbach project has won several awards including the Austrian State Prize for Architecture, the Austrian State Prize for Communication and Public Relations, the Adwin 2015, the Icon of the International Iconic Award and the Innovation Award as "Architects' Client of the Year 2014" and the 2014 award by Vorarlberg Tourismus.

== The bus stops ==
Number	Object	Architect	Partner architect	Statics	Craftsmen	Main sponsor	Description
1	Bus stop Krumbach-Zwing	Smiljan Radić Clarke (Chile)	Bernardo Bader	Mader Flatz (Bregenz)	Felder Metall (Andelsbuch), Holzwerkstatt Markus Faißt (Hittisau), Oberhauser & Schedler Bau (Andelsbuch), Spenglerei Manfred Baldauf (Doren)	Morscher Bau (Mellau)	The inspiration for this design was drawn from traditional Bregenz Forest artisanry. The bus stop is a reference to the Bregenz Forest farmhouse timbering. At the bus stop, a piece of the room is cut out and set into the landscape. The bus shelter is a glass pavilion with a black concrete-coffered ceiling. There are two wooden chairs in peasant style as seating. Above the glass cube, a bird house is indicated which serves as attention and distraction.
2	Bus stop Unterkrumbach Nord	Ensamble Studio, Antón García-Abril/Débora Mesa (Spain)	Dietrich/Untertrifaller Architekten	Mader Flatz (Bregenz)	Zimmerei Gerhard Berchtold (Schwarzenberg)	Hypo Vorarlberg	For this bus stop, raw and untreated oak boards were stacked. The layering of the planks creates the effect that the space is both open and closed.
3	Bus stop Unterkrumbach Süd	Architecten De Vylder Vinck Taillieu (Belgium)	Thomas Mennel (MeMux Schwarzenberg)	gbd (Dornbirn)	Waldmetall Dietmar Bechter (Hittisau), Haller Bau (Sulzberg), Malerei Raid (Krumbach)	EHG Stahl Metall (Dornbirn)	The bus stop was created by the impression of automobile coping of alpine passes. According to the architects, the triangular-shaped metal construction represents the poetic act of folding triangular surfaces.
4	Bus stop Krumbach-Glatzegg	Wang Shu/Lu Wenyu – Amateur Architecture Studio (China)	Hermann Kaufmann (Schwarzach)	Merz Kley Partner (Dornbirn)	Kaufmann Zimmerei (Reuthe), Haller Bau (Sulzberg), Spenglerei Manfred Baldauf (Doren)	Sutterlüty (Egg)	The architects were interested in a clear view in both directions. For this reason, the effect of a "Camera obscura" – a conical space – was planned. They wanted to achieve a focused perception of the surrounding landscape rather than of the object itself.
5	Bus stop Krumbach-Kressbad	Rintala Eggertsson Architects (Norway)	Baumschlager Hutter Partners	Mader Flatz (Bregenz)	Tischlerei Steurer mit Krumbacher Handwerkern, Schindeln Peter Lässer (Lingenau), Malerei Raid (Krumbach), Musikverein Krumbach, Offroader Krumbach	I+R Schertler Bau (Lauterach)	The bus stop is located at a tennis court. This allowed the team of architects to add an additional social offer to the bus shelter: a small stand for the tennis court. It was functionally designed as a wooden construction and clad with shingles. The architects' aspiration was to combine 'demand' and 'potential'.
6	Bus stop Oberkrumbach	Alexander Brodsky (Russia)	Hugo Dworzak (Architekturwerkstatt Lustenau)	Merz Kley Partner (Dornbirn)	Zimmerei Gerhard Bilgeri (Riefensberg), Spenglerei Manfred Baldauf (Doren), Oberhauser & Schedler Bau (Andelsbuch), Malerei Raid (Krumbach), Raum in Form Raimund Fink (Krumbach)	Rhomberg Gruppe (Bregenz)	The bus stop is located on a plot shared with a family home. On account of the limited space, the architect erected a radically simple wooden tower. It is open on all sides, with three sides of it glazed. At the level of the first floor, there are small window-like gaps without glazing.
7	Bus stop Krumbach-Bränden	Sou Fujimoto (Japan)	Bechter Zaffignani Architekten (Bregenz)	gbd (Dornbirn)	Eberle Metall Exclusiv (Hittisau), Malerei Raid (Krumbach), Zimmerei Gerhard Berchtold (Schwarzenberg), Haller Bau (Sulzberg)	Illwerke/VKW-Gruppe (Bregenz)	The architect Sou Fujimoto seeks to unite nature and architecture. The bus stop is designed to promote the dialogue with nature and not to provide protection from it. The "space frame" should serve as a possibility for interaction. The bus stop consists of white painted thin steel bars. Within this open sculpture, a staircase winds upwards. It should enable a new dimension of perception of place, space and nature.
