= Reuthe =

- Municipality
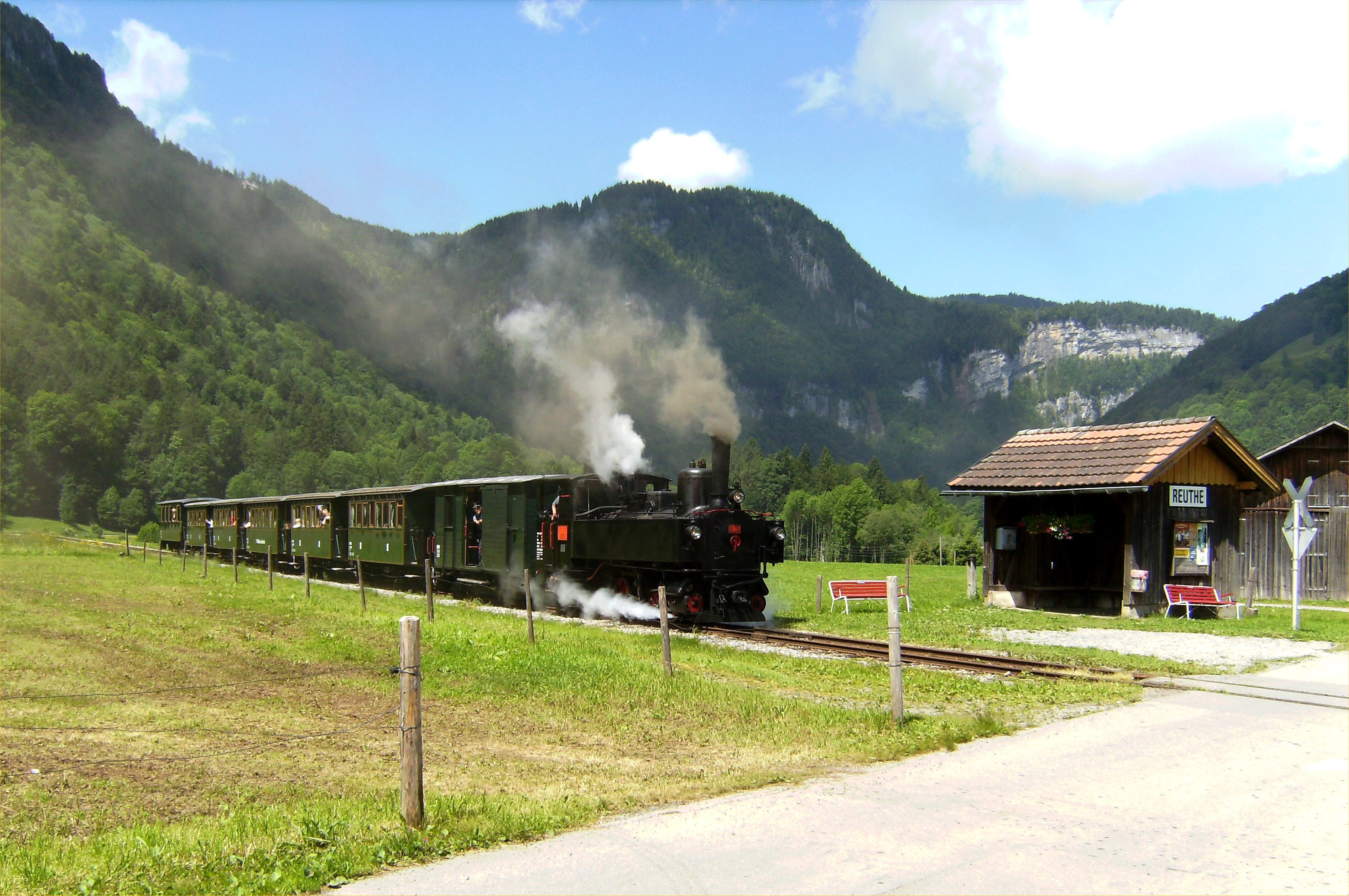

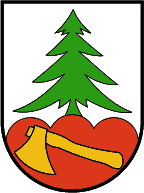
- Coat of arms

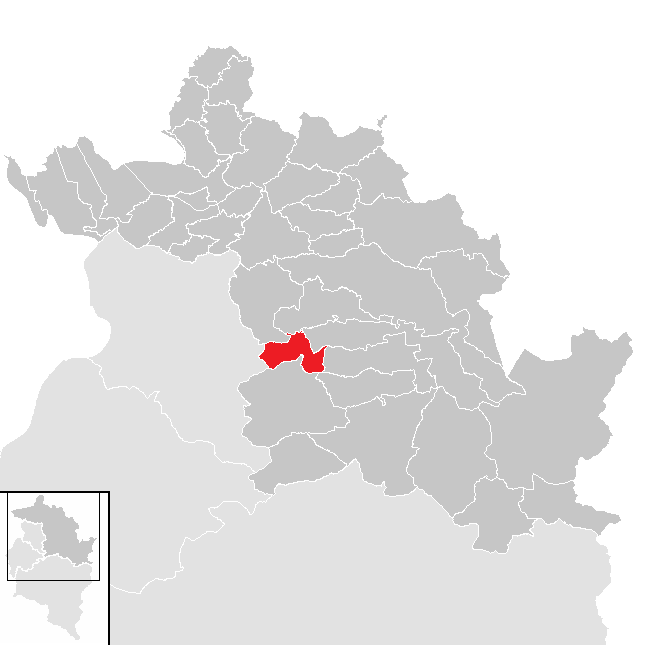
- Location in the district

- Location within Austria
- Coordinates: 47°22′12″N 09°53′36″E
- Country: Austria
- State: Vorarlberg
- District: Bregenz

Government
  - Mayor: Bianca Moosbrugger Petter

Area
  - Total: 10.24 km^{2} (3.95 sq mi)
- Elevation: 650 m (2,130 ft)

Population (2018-01-01)
  - Total: 658
  - Density: 64.3/km^{2} (166/sq mi)
- Time zone: UTC+1 (CET)
  - Summer (DST): UTC+2 (CEST)
- Postal code: 6870
- Area code: 05514
- Vehicle registration: B
- Website: www.reuthe.at

Reuthe is a municipality of the Bregenzerwald, in the westernmost Austrian state of Vorarlberg. It is located in the district of Bregenz. Its main industry is tourism.

== Population ==
Historical population
Year	Pop.	±%
1869	315	—
1880	331	+5.1%
1890	257	−22.4%
1900	356	+38.5%
1910	357	+0.3%
1923	298	−16.5%
1934	349	+17.1%
1939	357	+2.3%
1951	418	+17.1%
1961	429	+2.6%
1971	534	+24.5%
1981	520	−2.6%
1991	578	+11.2%
2001	586	+1.4%
2011	611	+4.3%

== Geography ==
One of the smallest towns in Vorarlberg, with respect to population and geography, Reuthe has an area of 10.24 km^{2}. 53.4% of the community area is forested, 11.6% is alpland.

== Culture ==
The parish church Hl. Jakobus was built in 1248. In 2002 a new organ was installed.

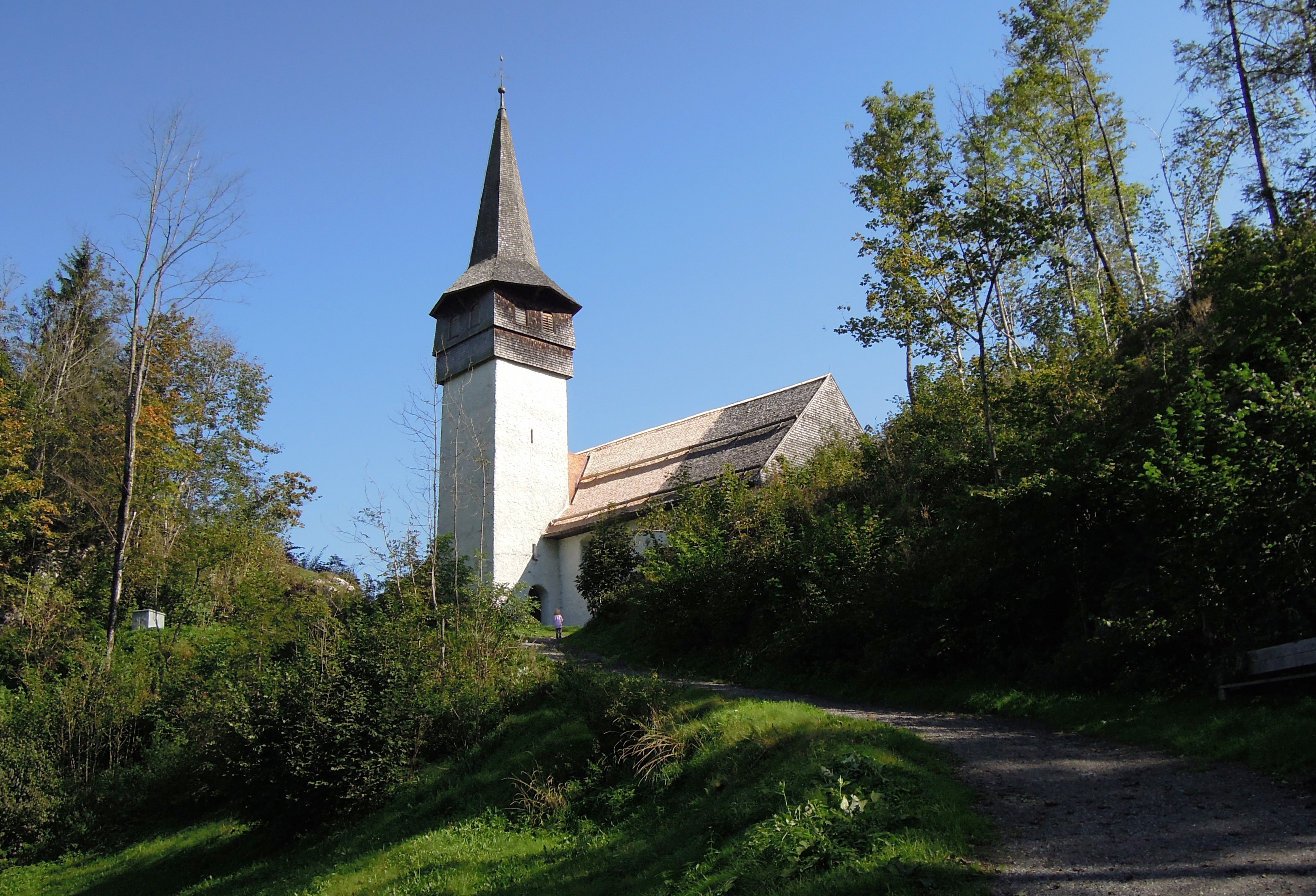
Parish church St. Jakobus

Reuthe is part of the Bregenzerwald Umgang (literally "Bregenzerwald Walking Tour"). This walking tour offers insights into the architecture and community planning of 12 traditional villages in the Bregenzerwald. While walking over various landscapes, visiting public buildings, homes and everyday objects, walkers gain a comprehensive overview of typical Bregenzerwald architectural styles as they developed throughout the ages.
