= Juppenwerkstatt Riefensberg =

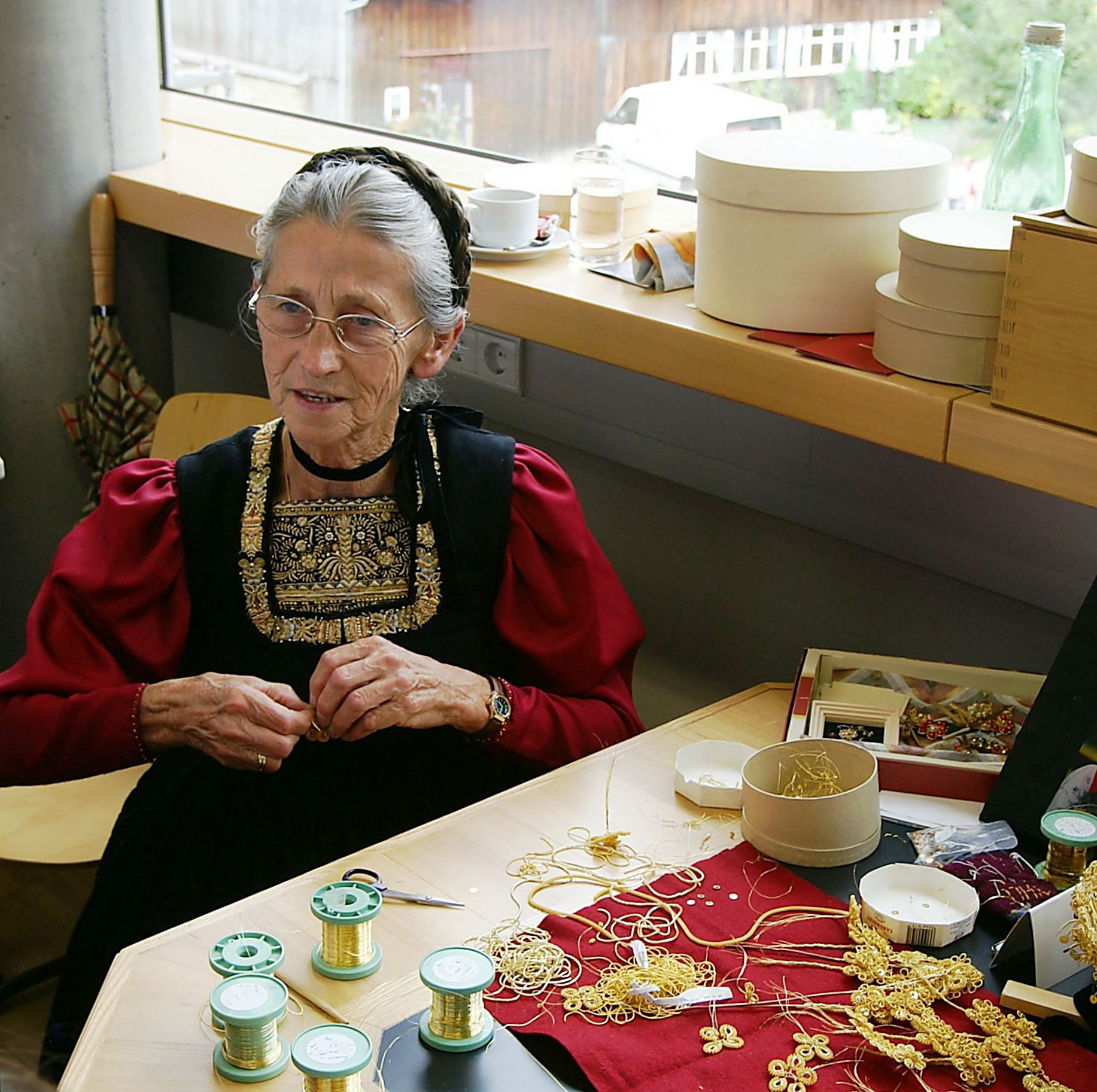
- Woman fabricating a juppe (2007)
- Established: 2003
- Location: Riefensberg, Vorarlberg, Austria
- Coordinates: 47.5052°N 9.9639°E
- Type: Craft museum, tracht museum
- President: Martina Mätzler
- Architect: Gerhard Gruber
- Website: http://www.juppenwerkstatt.at/

The Juppenwerkstatt Riefensberg is a craft workshop and museum in Riefensberg in Vorarlberg (Austria).

It is a non-profit association that pursues the goal of maintaining and caring for the Vorarlberg costumes, especially the Bregenz Forest women's costumes. It is the only manufacture in the Bregenz Forest that still produces the Bregenzerwälder tracht in the traditional way.

The Juppenwerkstatt is also the point of contact when it comes to assessing, appraising or mediating already used traditional costumes or accessories.

== The juppe ==
The juppe is a woman's costume and headgear from the Bregenz Forest. The origin of the word juppe is the French word for skirt, "jupe". Juppenwerkstatt literally means "workshop of the juppe".

The juppe is one of the oldest costumes in Europe. In its basic cut, this type of costume can be traced back to the Early Middle Ages. At that time still white (saves the dye colour), later brown, it came under the influence of Spanish fashion, in which black and indigo blue were the expensive colors of the nobility.

=== The fabrication ===
The production and the dyeing of the fabric for the juppe is a centuries-old craft that is only practiced in the Juppenwerkstatt Riefensberg. The workshop works on pre-order and only in a small number in stock.

For dyeing, glue is boiled for hours in pots according to an ancient recipe, which is made from 16 kilos of cowhide. The black-dyed linen fabric is dipped into it, slightly twisted, laid out on the meadow and then shined and pleated by machines that are more than a hundred years old.

The pleating machine set up in Riefensberg was built by a Bregenz Forest locksmith over many years after he had drawn a machine that was exhibited at the Paris World's Fair in 1889 in great detail, and has since replaced the otherwise very laborious pleating by hand.

The Juppenwerkstatt Riefensberg produces a special juppe fabric made of glossy linen. It is worldwide exclusively produced there. The textile takes a full six months until it is finally suitable for further processing.

The Bregenz Forest is the only valley in which there is a separate artisan for every detail of the traditional costume. These include hat makers, jupp seamstresses, embroiderers, weavers and goldsmiths for the belt buckles.

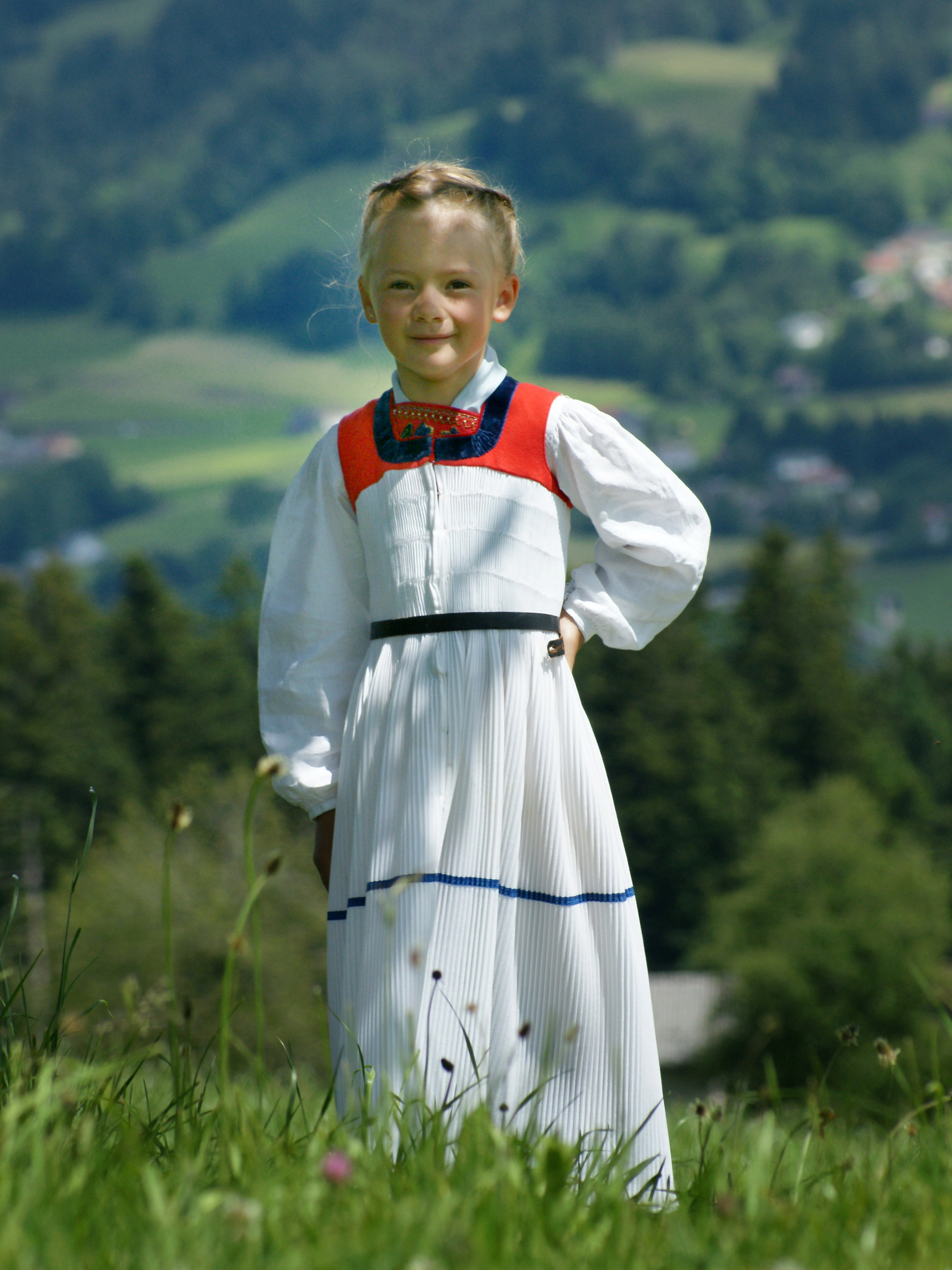
Girl in a white juppe (front)

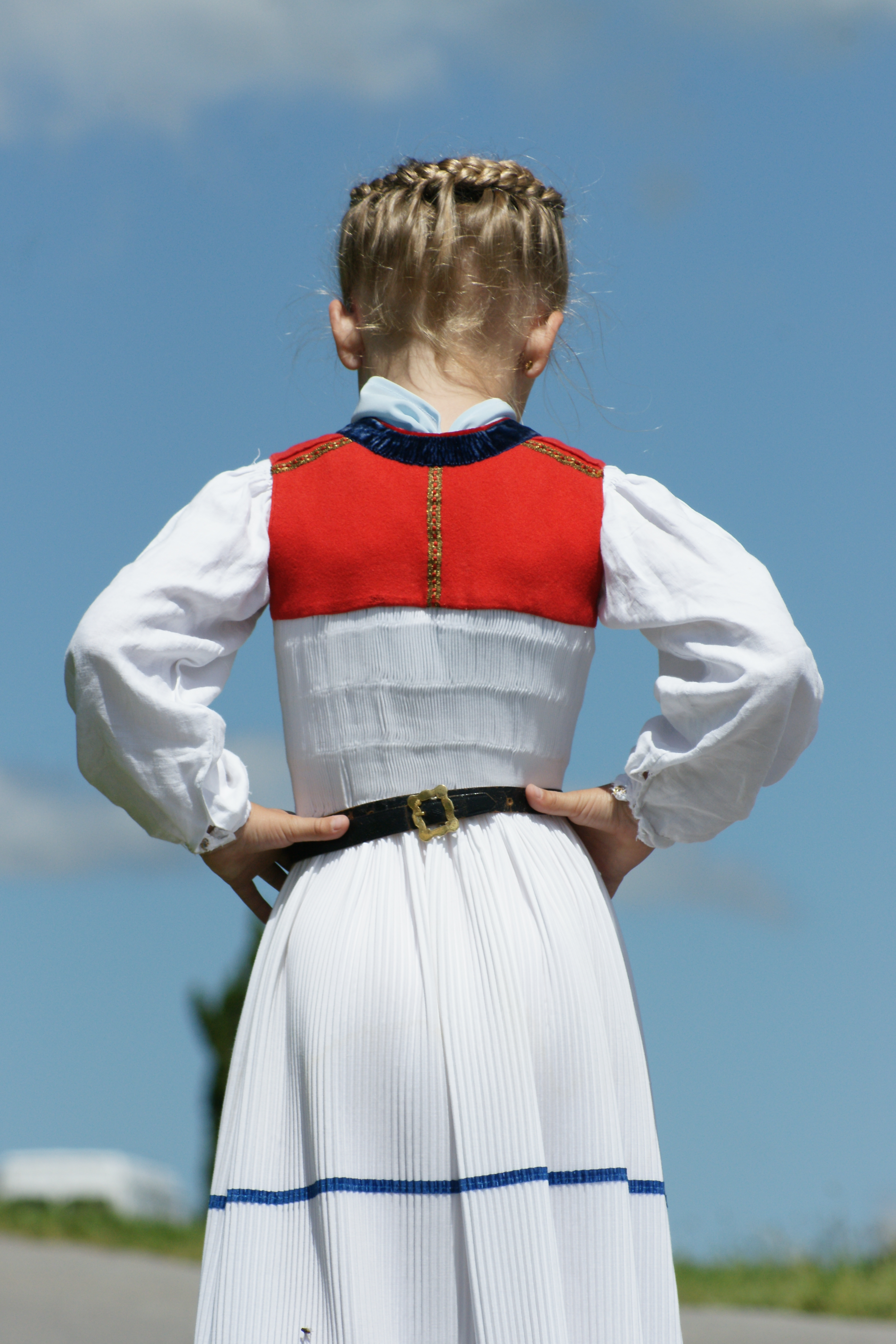
Girl in a white juppe (back)

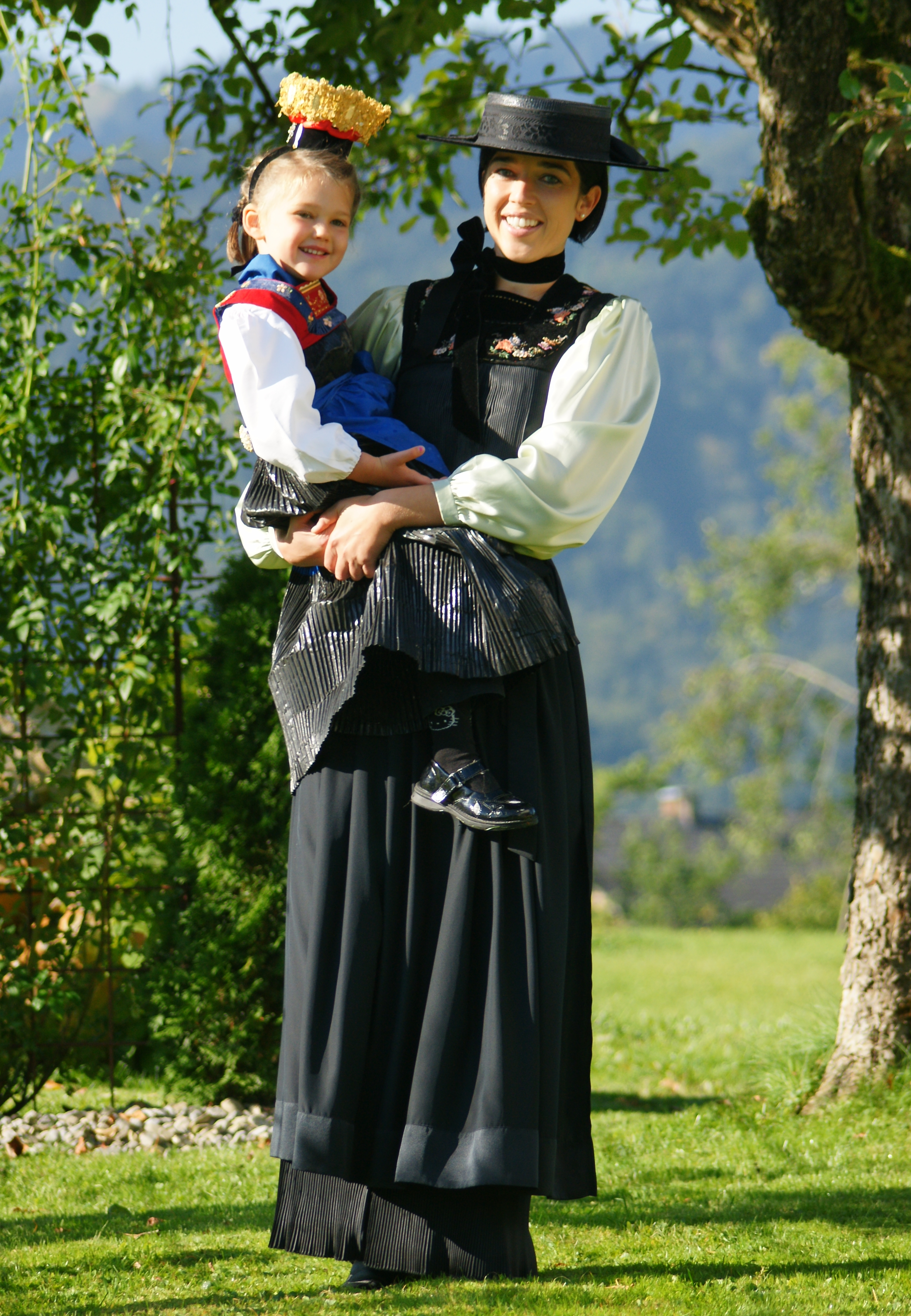
Woman in blackmith costume with daughter in redmith costume

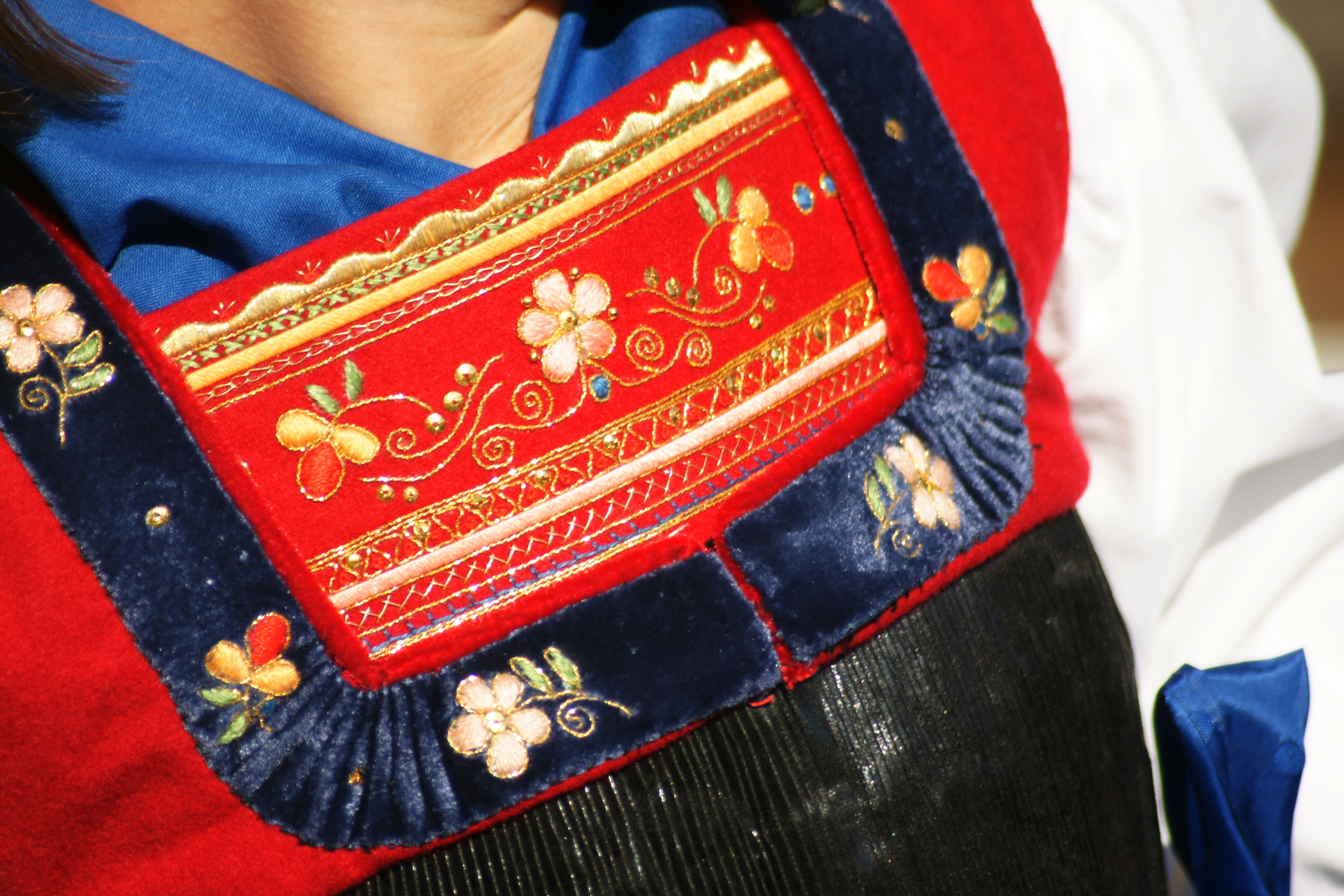
The "Bleotz" which is artfully decorated with gold-silver embroidery

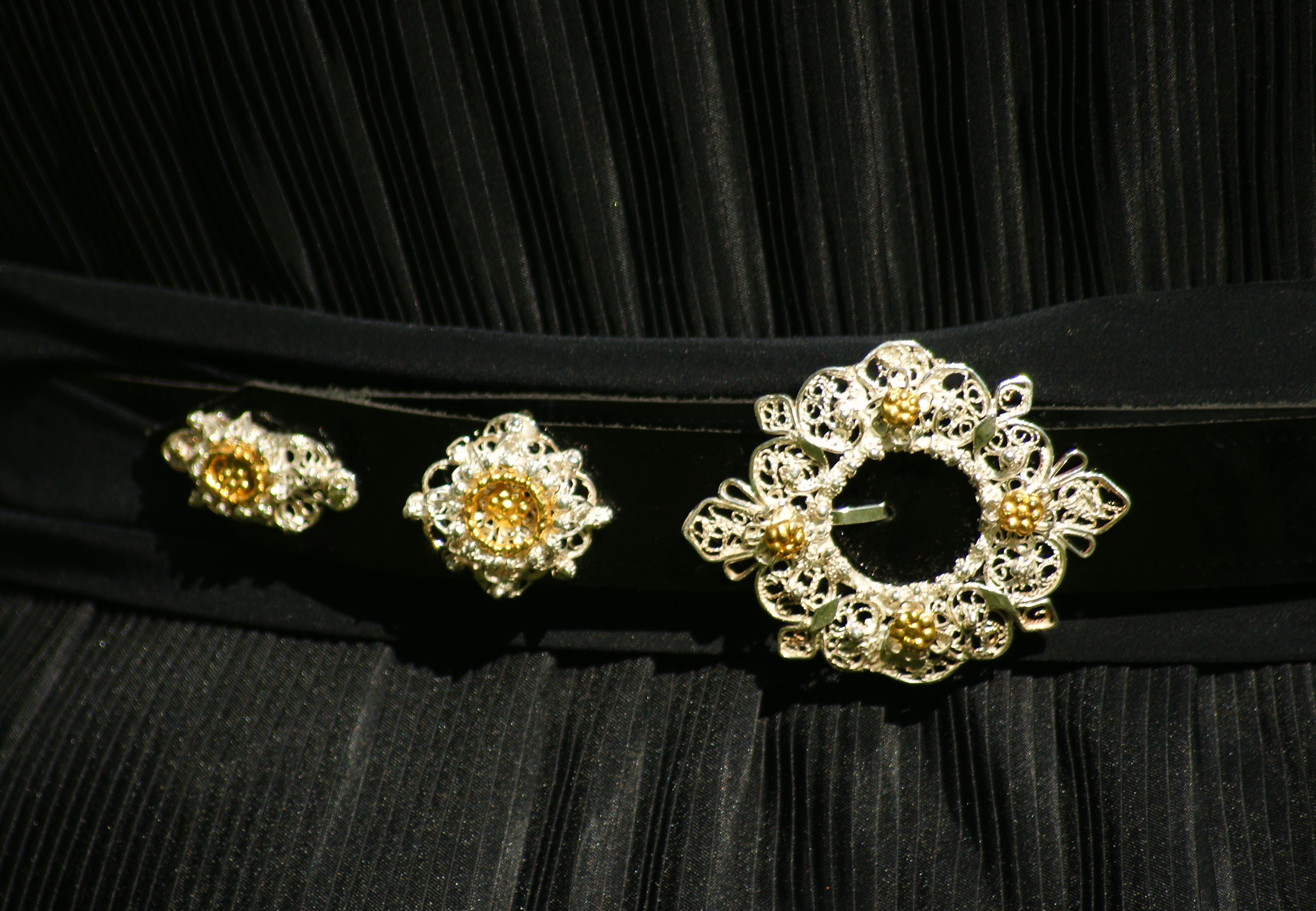
Three-part belt of a female Bregenz Forest costume

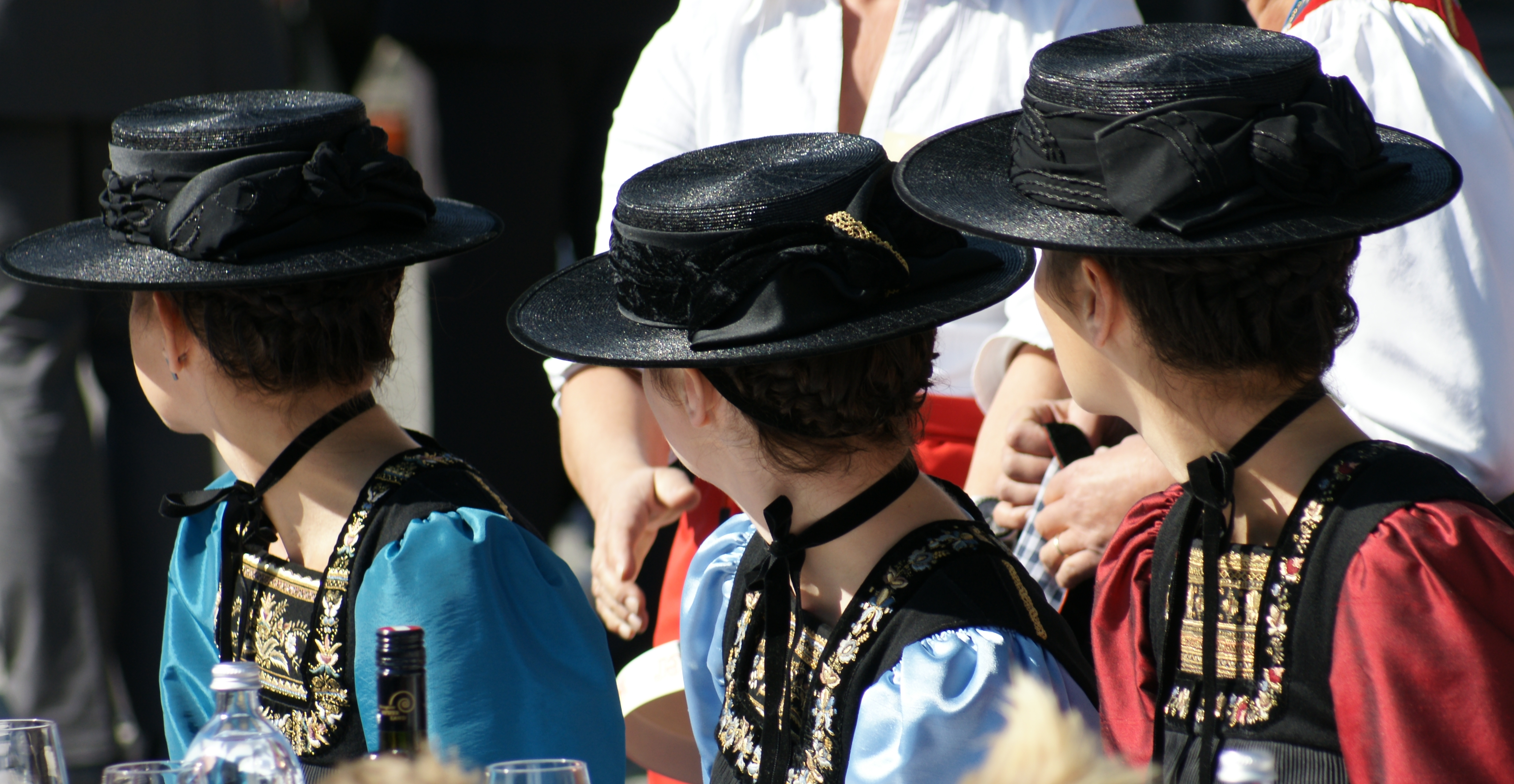
Women in the Bregenz Forest costume with summer straw hats ("Schäohüte")

== The museum ==
The Juppenwerkstatt Riefensberg is open to visitors from May 1 to October 31. Visitors are able to get an idea of the hard work and to follow the creation process of the stiff, shiny fabric, which is laid in hundreds of folds. In order to introduce visitors to the elaborate production of a Bregenz Forest women's costume, a seamstress, embroiderer, weaver or hat maker is present as part of a tour. Guided tours are possible by appointment.

The Juppenwerkstatt has its own collection of costumes, which it is constantly expanding and which is presented as part of the exhibitions.

Special exhibitions deal with different parts of the tracht (e.g., the belt, the hat), with the production and treatment of the juppe fabric (e.g., transfer printing and embossing) or with various costume designs from the region and beyond.

=== History of the museum ===
In 1993, when the last traditional costume dyer in the Bregenz Forest closed his business due to age, the continued existence of the traditional linen costume of the Bregenz Forest women was in danger. It was not produced for ten years. Shortly before the death of the last costume dyer, he passed on the secret of the juppe dyeing.

With the support of the state and the European LEADER programme, the municipality of Riefensberg was ready to set up a new costume dyeing facility in the business section of the old Krone inn, which was supposed to provide the fabrics for the continuing need for Juppen and give visitors an insight into the manufacturing process. In 2002, the non-profit organisation "Juppenwerkstatt Riefensberg" was founded. In 2003, the workshop and museum was opened.

=== Architecture ===
The Bregenz architect Gerhard Gruber was commissioned with the adaptation of a 350-year-old farm building in the center of Riefensberg. This means that the old farmhouse was not demolished and replaced by a functional new building, but the current user, the Juppenwerkstatt, adapted to the circumstances. The renovation was carried out by local craft businesses using locally available building materials.

The dye works was built in the basement, while further work steps on the way to the juppe are housed in the former cattle barn, horse stable and haystack. The three main work areas finishing kitchen (dyeing black and strengthening with glue), glazing room (shining) and pleating room (pleating) are housed here. Heating the building would not be justifiable from an energetic point of view, so the workshop is closed in winter. Only one room inside the room, a "box" in the barn, can be heated. The sewing room is located in it and the room functions as a course room. The top and bottom of the box reinforce the gable wall. The wooden shingle facade on the northeast side of the building was completely replaced by a facade made of large glass shingles. This allowed the character of the old windowless facade to be retained.

When asked about the nature of his project, Gerhard Gruber thinks that the Juppenwerkstatt corresponds to the attempt to counteract the "museumisation" of the valuable Bregenzerwald costume, the thicket and the dust of decades and to keep the dialogue between tradition and progress going.

== See also ==
- List of museums of Vorarlberg
