= Furkajoch =

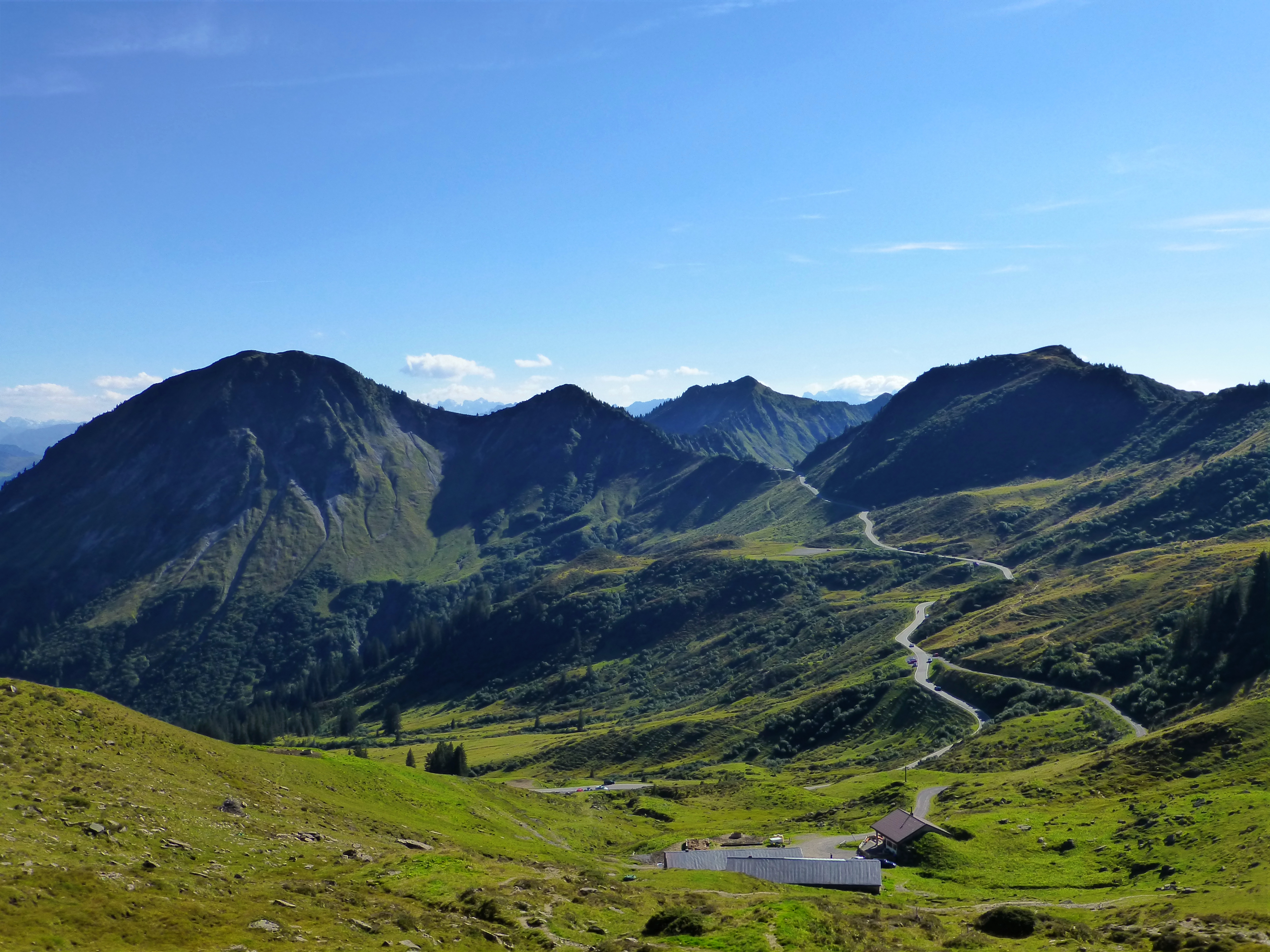

- Location within Alps
- Elevation: 1,761 metres (5,778 ft)
- Traversed by: L51

Third Approach
- Location: Austria
- Range: Alps
- Coordinates: 47°16′0″N 09°49′58″E

Furkajoch (el. 1761 m.) is a high mountain pass in the Austrian Alps in the Bundesland of Vorarlberg.

It connects the valley of the Bregenzer Ach (Bregenzer Wald) near Damüls with the Frutz valley near Laterns.

The road is very popular with motorcycle riders and is closed in winter.

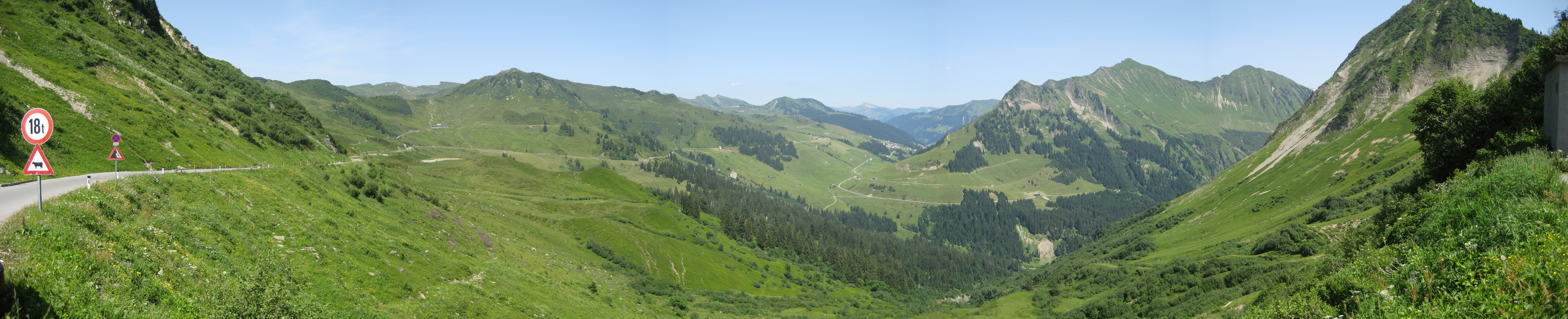
View heading East
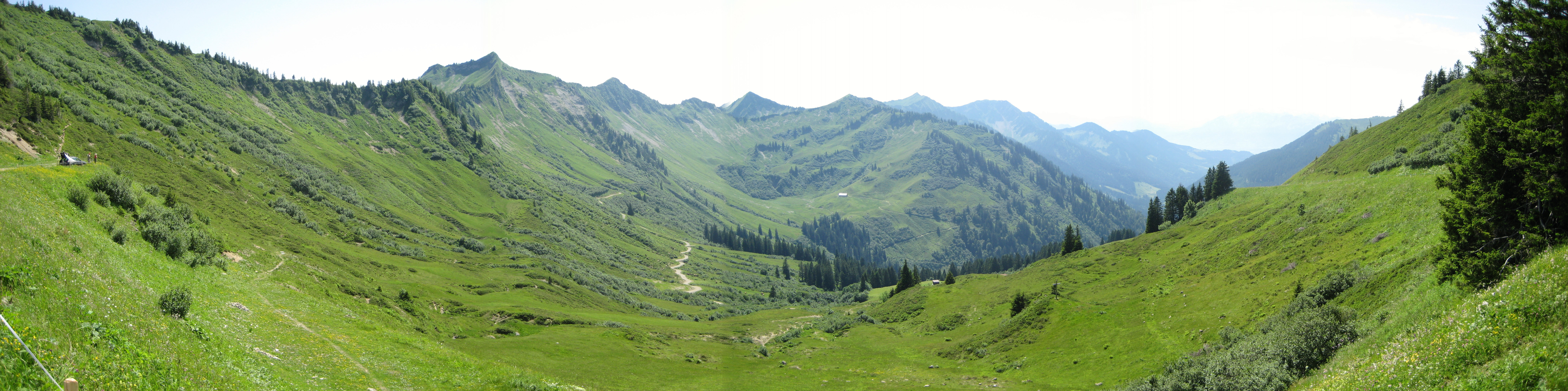
View heading West

== See also ==
- List of highest paved roads in Europe
- List of mountain passes
