= Riefensberg =

- Municipality
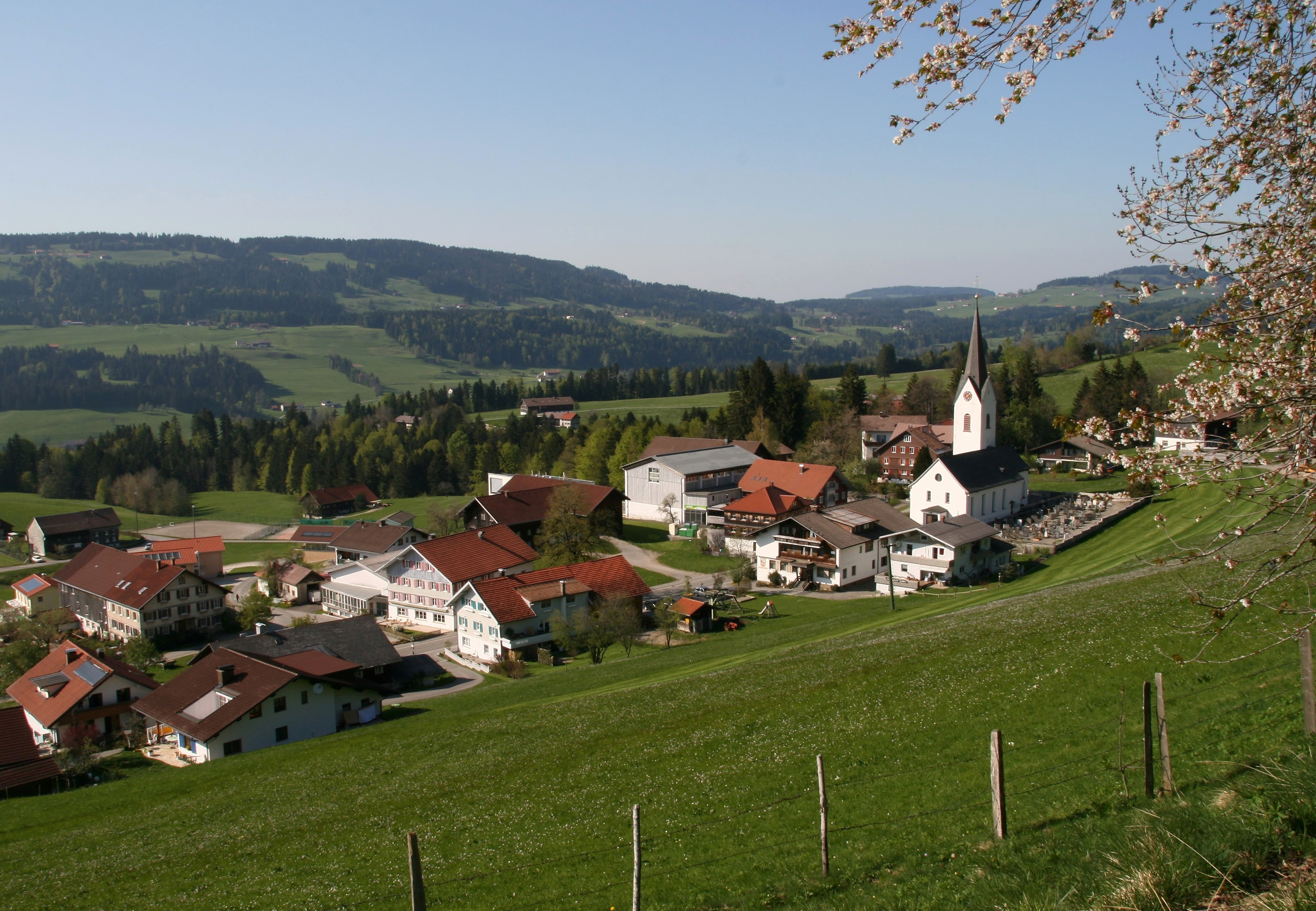

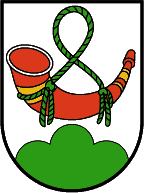
- Coat of arms

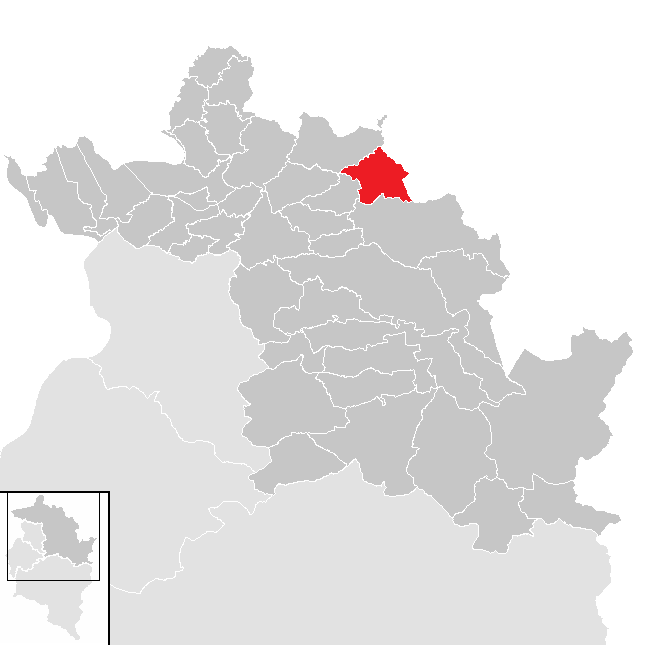
- Location in the district

- Location within Austria
- Coordinates: 47°30′17″N 09°57′50″E
- Country: Austria
- State: Vorarlberg
- District: Bregenz

Government
  - Mayor: Ulrich Schmelzenbach

Area
  - Total: 14.85 km^{2} (5.73 sq mi)
- Elevation: 781 m (2,562 ft)

Population (2018-01-01)
  - Total: 1,086
  - Density: 73.13/km^{2} (189.4/sq mi)
- Time zone: UTC+1 (CET)
  - Summer (DST): UTC+2 (CEST)
- Postal code: 6943
- Area code: 05513
- Vehicle registration: B
- Website: www.riefensberg.at

Riefensberg is a municipality in the district of Bregenz in the westernmost Austrian state of Vorarlberg. The community of Riefensberg covers an area of 14.85 square kilometers. Riefensberg is located within the Nagelfluhkette Nature Park.

== Population ==
Historical population
Year	Pop.	±%
1869	805	—
1880	750	−6.8%
1890	727	−3.1%
1900	729	+0.3%
1910	704	−3.4%
1923	699	−0.7%
1934	731	+4.6%
1939	689	−5.7%
1951	816	+18.4%
1961	778	−4.7%
1971	818	+5.1%
1981	889	+8.7%
1991	907	+2.0%
2001	971	+7.1%
2011	989	+1.9%

== History ==
The town of Riefensberg ("rivinsperc") was mentioned for the first time in 1249, in a document by Pope Innocent IV.

== Culture ==
The St. Leonhard parish church was built in 1426, enlarged between 1818 and 1821, and renovated from 1969 to 1971.

The St. Anna chapel was built in the 18th century and is rich in Baroque statues.

In 2010, a roughly 300-year-old millstone of the Auer Mill was found. Riefensberg had several mills from the 17th to the 19th centuries. The grinding stone is exhibited on a walking route.

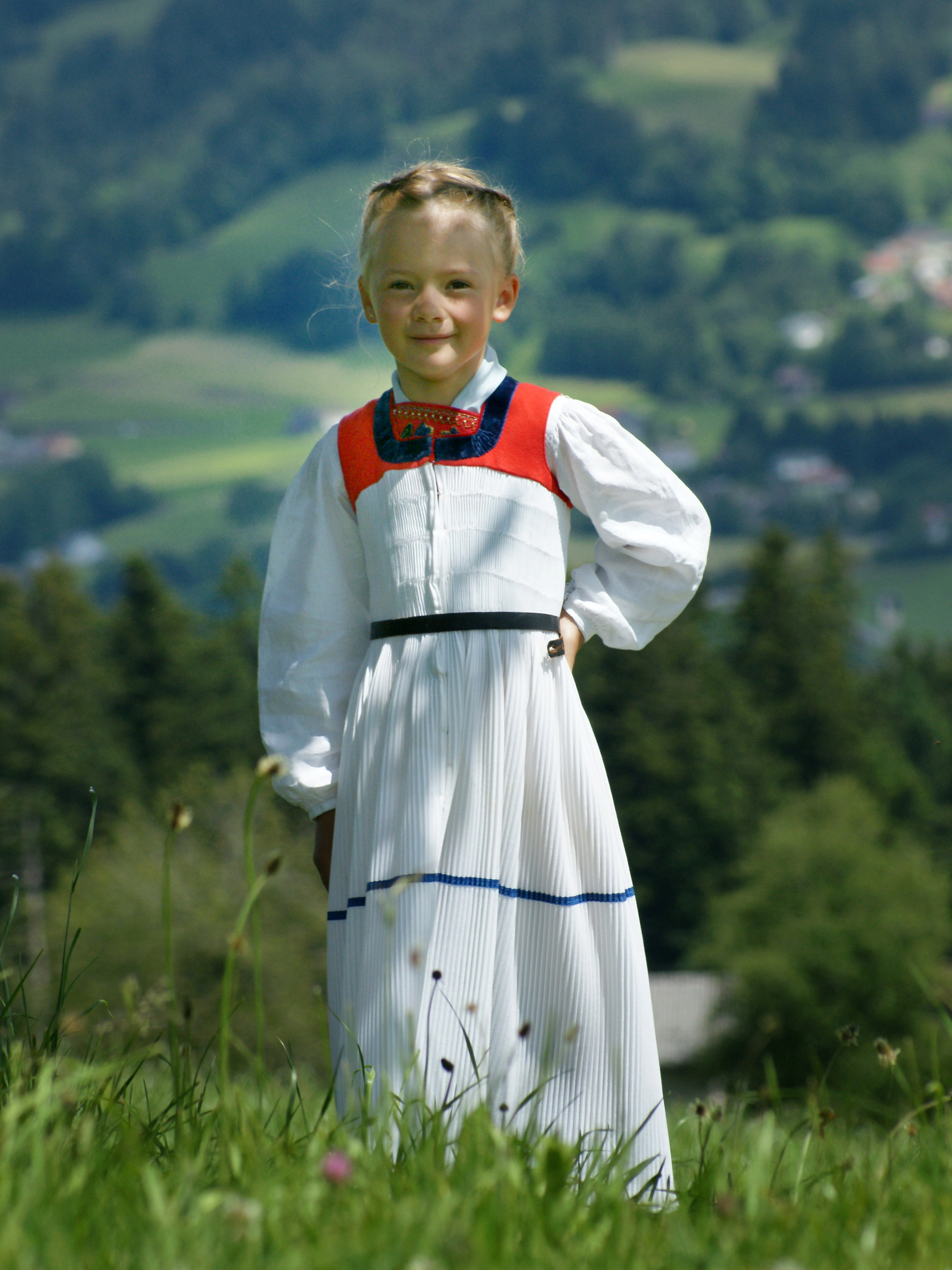
Girl in a traditional Bregenzerwälder Juppe

In the Juppenwerkstatt Riefensberg, traditional Bregenz Forest costumes are still dyed and sewn. The typical "Bregenzerwälder Juppe" is not sold "ready-made" in shops, but can only be custom-made in the Juppenwerkstatt. Nowadays, many Bregenzerwälder women wear the Juppe at weddings and in church on Sundays.
