= List of museums in Vorarlberg =

This list of museums in the state of Vorarlberg, Austria contains museums which are defined for this context as institutions (including nonprofit organizations, government entities, and private businesses) that collect and care for objects of cultural, artistic, scientific, or historical interest and make their collections or related exhibits available for public viewing. Also included are non-profit art galleries and university art galleries.

== The list ==
Name	Location	Type	Summary
Alemanni Museum Village	Mäder	Regional	website. Alemanni, ethnography
Alpine Dairy Museum	Hittisau	Local	website. Alpine dairy organization and production, alpine transhumance
Alpine Museum Tannberg	Schröcken	Local	website. Mountain life
Alpinism and Tourism Museum Montafon	Gaschurn	Local, regional	website. Alpine mountain life, local culture
Angelika Kauffmann Museum	Schwarzenberg	Local, art	website. Exhibitions featuring paintings of Angelica Kauffmann. Art and local heritage
Arche Noah	Hohenems	Nature, art	website. Art and nature
Art in the Rohnerhaus Gallery	Lauterach	Art gallery	website. Private art collection open to the public
Beekeeping Museum Immenhof	Nenzing-Beschling	Nature	website. Museum of apiculture (beekeeping)
Bezau Local Heritage Museum	Bezau	Local	website. Local heritage, culture and traditions
Bludenz Municipal Museum	Bludenz	Local	website. Local history, culture and traditions
Bregenz Forest Railway	Bezau–Schwarzenberg	Railway	website. Heritage narrow gauge railway operating from Bezau station via Reuthe to Schwarzenberg station
Brewery Museum Fohrenburg	Bludenz	Beverages	website. Brewery and brewery museum
Bürserberg Local Heritage Museum (Paarhof »Buacher«)	Bürserberg	Local heritage	website. Local heritage, culture and traditions
Christmas Tree Decoration Museum	Dornbirn	Folklore, heritage	website. Christmas decorations
Crèche Museum	Dornbirn	Folklore, heritage	website. Crèches (nativity scenes) from around the world
Dornbirn City Museum	Dornbirn	Local	website. Local history, culture, farm life, industry
Egg Village Museum	Egg	Local	website. Local history and culture
Embroidery Museum	Lustenau	Textiles, industry	website. Embroidery and textiles
Fire Department Museum – Oldtimers	Hard	Firefighting	website. Firefighting vehicles, equipment, oldtimers
FIS Skiing and Mountaineering Museum	Damüls	Skiing, mountaineering	website. Exhibits about 100+ years of Vorarlberg's skiing history
FLATZ Museum	Dornbirn	Art	website. Contemporary art
Franz Michael Felder Museum	Schoppernau	Literature, heritage	website. F.M. Felder, farmer, author, social critic
Frühmesshaus Museum	Bartholomäberg	Local heritage	website. Used for Catholic masses; Baroque architecture and furniture
Good Old Times	Hohenems	History	website. Nostalgia and yesteryear
Graphic Reproductions Museum	Rankweil	Graphic arts	website. Graphic arts museum
Grosses Walsertal Museum, Biosphere Park Museum	Sonntag	Heritage, Natural history	website, website.
Hittisau Heritage Museum	Hittisau	Local	website. Local heritage, customs, history
Inatura	Dornbirn	Natural history	website. Natural history, permanent and temporary exhibitions
Jewish Cemetery	Hohenems	Historic cemetery	website. Well-preserved, historic Jewish cemetery
Jewish Museum of Hohenems	Hohenems	History	website, Jewish community of Hohenems, history, customs
Jewish Quarter	Hohenems	Historic town quarter	website. Historic Jewish quarter
Juppenwerkstatt Riefensberg	Riefensberg	Local	website, Museum and manufactory of traditional garb ("Tracht")
Klostertal Museum	Wald/Arlberg	Local	website. Alpine local culture and traditions
Künstlerhaus Bregenz – Thurn und Taxis Museum	Bregenz	Fine arts	website. Art exhibitions
Kunsthaus Bregenz – KUB	Bregenz	Fine arts	website. Exhibitions of international contemporary art
Kunstraum Dornbirn	Dornbirn	Fine arts	website. Art, architecture
Lebensbilder	Hittisau	Local heritage	website. Local heritage, culture and traditions
Lechmuseum – Wanderweg	Lech/Arlberg	Nature, hiking	website. Culture on the hiking trail
Lechmuseum – Huber-Hus	Lech-Tannberg	Local heritage	website. Culture, history, language
Linzenberg Denkmalhof Local Heritage Museum	Schwarzach	Local heritage	website. Local heritage, culture, and traditions
Martinsturm Museum	Bregenz	Local and regional	website. Local and regional history, traditions, heritage
Mesmers Stall	Alberschwende	Local heritage, arts	website. Local heritage. Arts and crafts
Milling Museum (Stoffels)	Hohenems	Open air	website. Sawmill and flour mill, milling technology
Mining Museum Silbertal	Silbertal/Montafon	Mining	website. Mining, geology
Mohren Biererlebniswelt	Dornbirn	Brewery	website. Brewery and museum
Motorcycle Museum	Feldkirch	Technology	website. Motorcycles
Museum of Baroque Master Builders	Au	Art history	website. Baroque master builders and craftsmen from Au and the Bregenz Forest.
Otten Kunstraum	Hohenems	Fine arts	website. Fine arts exhibitions, events
Prehistory Museum	Koblach	History	website. Pre- and protohistory
Printing Museum	Lustenau	Media	website. Historic printing presses, history of media
Puppet and Toy Museum	Blons	Crafts	website. Puppets and toys
Rauch's Radio Museum	Lustenau	Technology	website. Historic radios, gramophones, etc.
Rhein-Schauen	Lustenau	Hydrology, natural history	website. Information about the International Rhein Regulation Agency; historic narrow gauge railway
Rolls-Royce Museum	Dornbirn	Automotive	website. Automotive museum
Schattenburg Castle and Museum	Feldkirch	Local	website. Castle with exhibits of local history, culture; restaurant
Schruns Museum	Schruns	Local	website. Folk art, domestic life and customs, textile industry, farming
Schubertiade Quarter	Hohenems	Music, fine arts	website. Music and the fine arts
School House (Schulhaus)	Warth	Historic	website. Cultural-historical exhibitions
Skiing and Mountaineering Museum	Hirschegg	Mountain life	website. Mountaineering and skiing
Textile Printing Museum	Hard-Mittelweiherburg	Textiles	website. Textile printing exhibition
Tractor/Oldtimer Museum	Hard	Technology	website. Vintage tractors and other vehicles
Villa Rustica – Open-Air Roman Villa	Rankweil	History, archeology	website. Ancient Roman history in the Rhine Valley
Vorarlberg Military Museum	Bregenz	Military	website. Military museum
vorarlberg museum	Bregenz	History, arts	website. Archaeology, history, art and folklore
Walser Museum Kleinwalsertal	Riezlern	Local heritage	website. Local and regional culture and heritage
Werkraum Bregenzerwald	Andelsbuch	Woodworking, traditional crafts	website. Themed exhibitions, workshops, contests and lectures on craft and building culture.
Women's Museum	Hittisau	Herstory	website. Women's history, cultural achievements. Women’
World of Museums	Frastanz	Multiple museums	website. Electricity, firefighting, photography, cinema, rescue, hunting, gramophone, and tobacco museums
