= Dünser =

Dünser is a surname. Notable people with the surname include:

- Margret Dünser (1926–1980), Austrian journalist and author
- Richard Dünser (1959), Austrian composer
- Sabine Dünser (1977–2006), Liechtensteiner gothic metal singer and songwriter

== See also ==
- Dûnser
- Dünsser
- Dünßer
