= Hohenems-Dornbirn Airfield =

Recreational airfield in Austria

Hohenems-Dornbirn Airfield Flugplatz Hohenems-Dornbirn
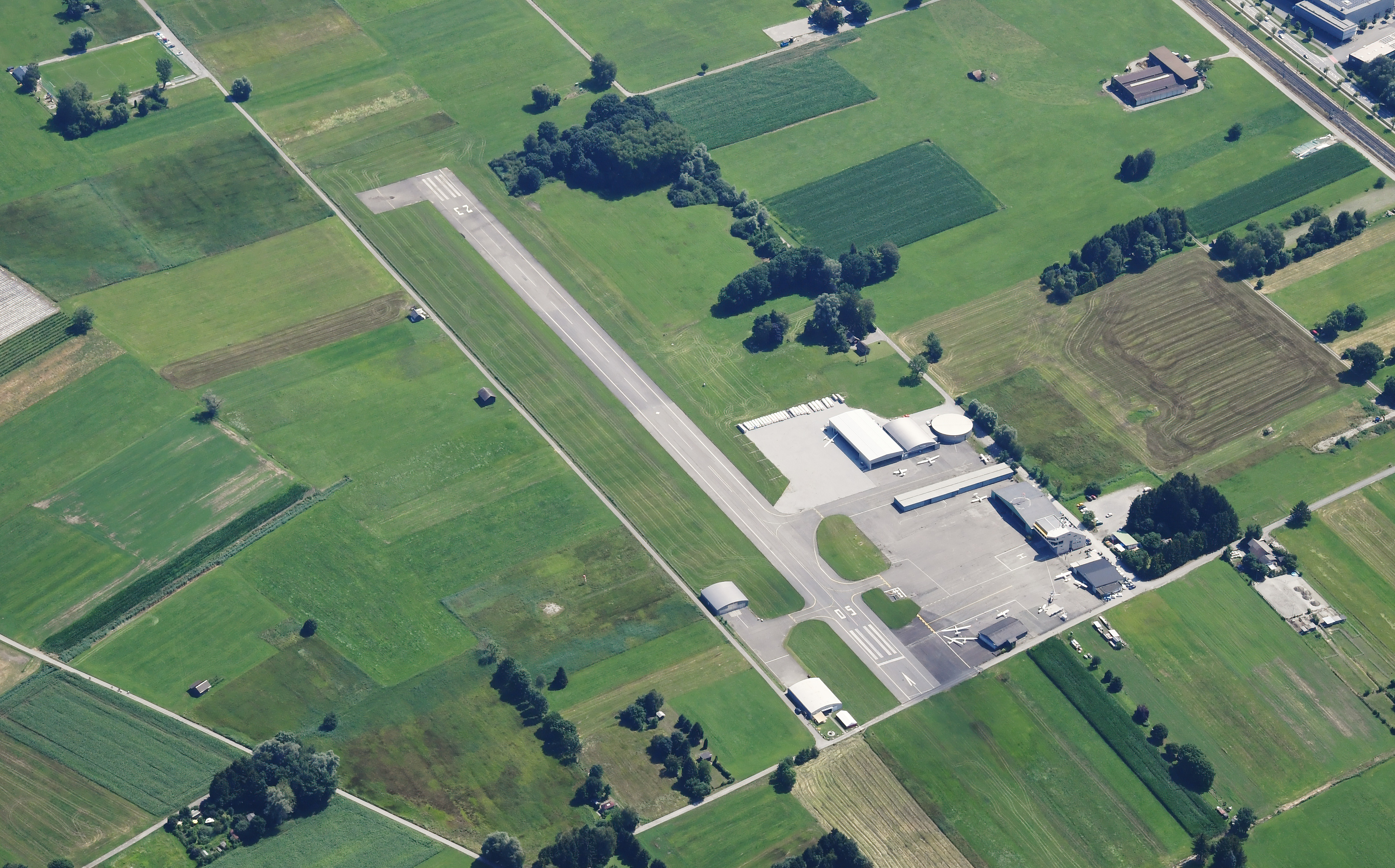
- IATA: HOH; ICAO: LOIH

Summary
- Airport type: Public
- Serves: Dornbirn, Austria
- Elevation AMSL: 1,352 ft / 412 m
- Coordinates: 47°23′4.3″N 009°41′59.2″E

Map
- Location of Hohenems-Dornbirn Airfield in Austria

Runways
Direction	Length		Surface
Direction	ft	m	Surface
05/23	2,080	634	Asphalt
- Source: Landings.com

Hohenems-Dornbirn Airfield (German: Flugplatz Hohenems-Dornbirn, IATA: HOH, ICAO: LOIH) is a public aerodrome located 5 kilometres (3 mi) southwest of Dornbirn, Vorarlberg, Austria. It is used for general aviation as well as air police and air rescue operations.

== See also ==
- Transport in Austria
- List of airports in Austria
