= Mohrenbrauerei =

Austrian brewery

- Location: Dornbirn, Vorarlberg, Austria
- Opened: 1834
- Key people: Heinz Huber, Thomas Pachole (managing directors)
- Annual production volume: 180,000 hectolitres (150,000 US bbl) in 2019
- Net income: €22.9 million (2016)
- Employees: About 120 (2016)
- Website: www.mohrenbrauerei.at/de

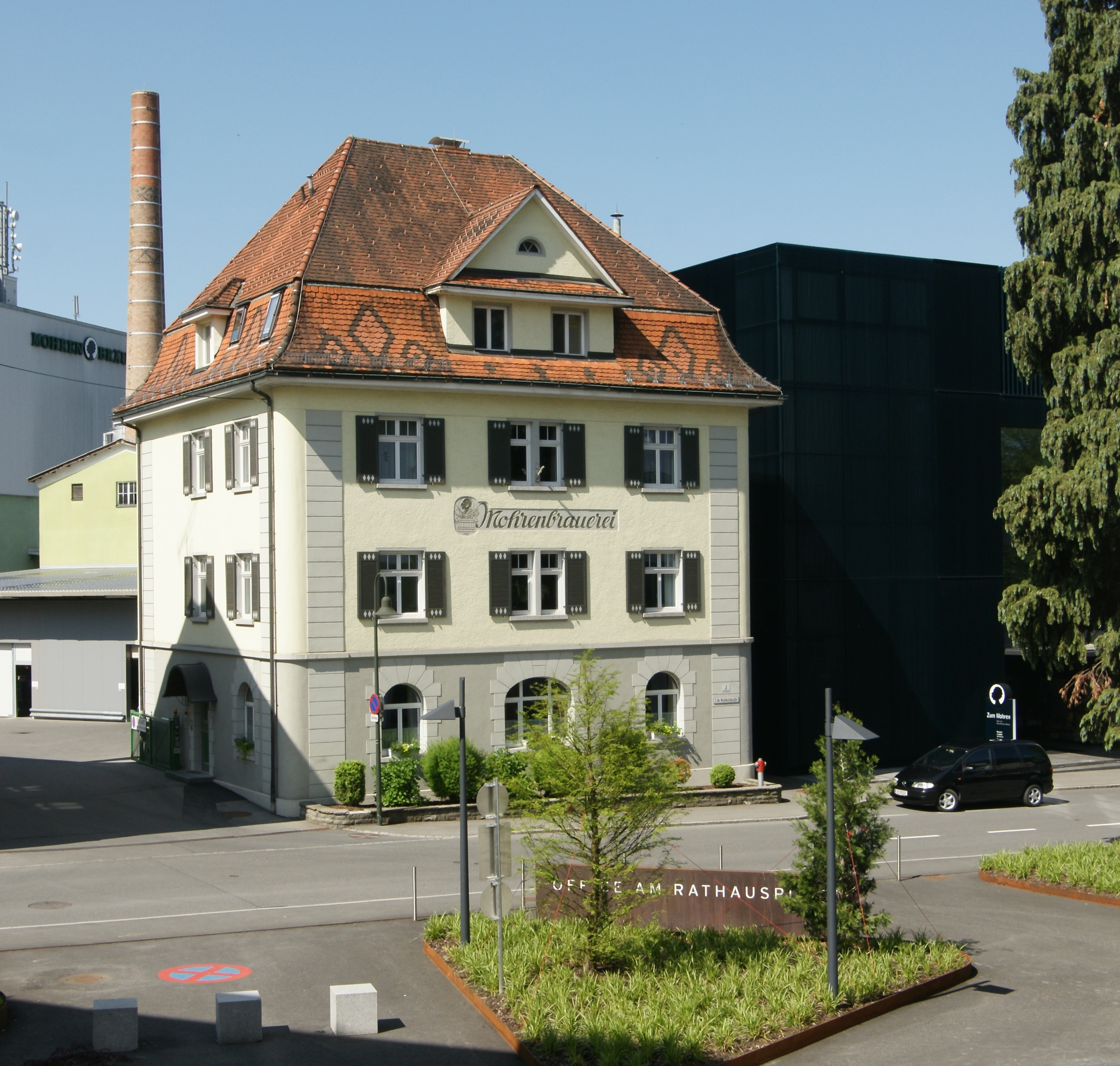
Mohren brewery in Dornbirn

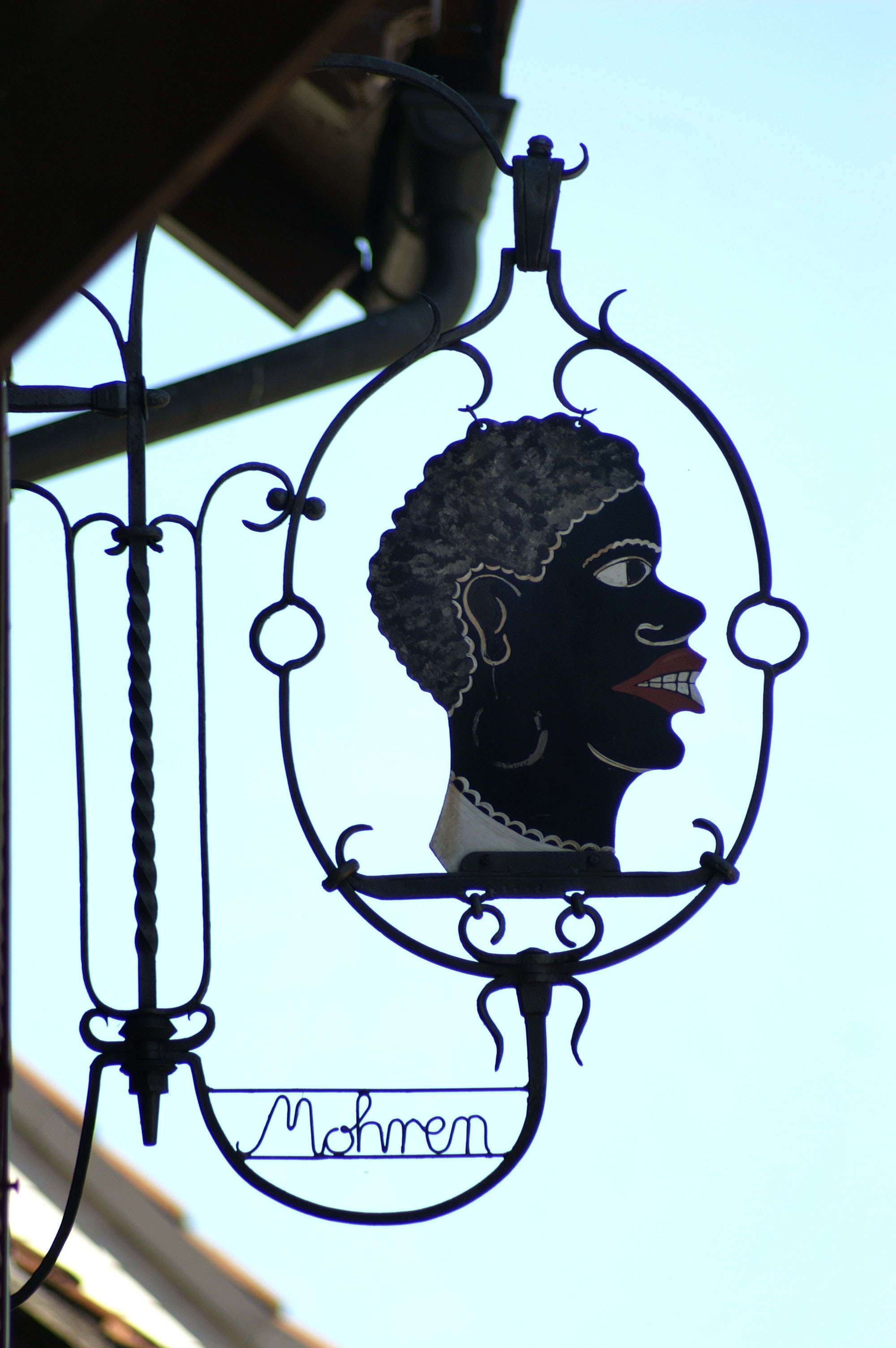
Logo of the Mohrenbräu on a sign of a tavern in Dornbirn

The Mohrenbrauerei Vertriebs KG is a brewery in Dornbirn in the Austrian state of Vorarlberg. It is Vorarlberg's oldest brewery. With a total market share of 47.2 percent in the gastronomy and retail sectors, in 2013, the Mohrenbrauerei was the market leader among the four Vorarlberg breweries.

== History ==
The origin of the current Mohrenbrauerei is the in "Zum Mohren", licensed to the owner of the inn and brewery Josef Mohr. The oldest found documentation on the new name "Mohrenwirt" dates back to 1784. In 1834, the catering and brewery business was transferred to the Huber family.

Franz Anton Huber, trader and locksmith in Dornbirn-Markt, bought the inn including the estate and associated brewery in 1834 from a farmer from Hohenems. The brewery has been family-owned since that day.

At the turn of the century, an amount 30,000 hl of beer per year has been produced under the East Silesian master brewer Anton Decker.

The end of World War II and declining demand had to stop production eventually. The brewery was temporarily converted into barracks and hosted Moroccan soldiers. The Mohrenbrauerei only recovered from this around 1951.

In 2012, the beverage production amounted to 222,911 hl per year, which sank to 180,000 in 2019.

== Name and logo ==
The name and logo of the Mohrenbrauerei are controversial. The logo has repeatedly been criticized for reproducing racist stereotypes. The logo depicts a heraldic Moor's head, showing an African with bulging lips and curly hair.

Mohr is an outdated term for people of African descent, widely in use during the 18th and 19th centuries. Duden, Germany’s standard dictionary, calls it “archaic” and “discriminatory by contemporary standards.”

The company's communication has been described as constructing their own myth about their own “Mohren” and therefore not considering racial meanings.

In 1834, today's co-owner, the Huber family, took over the Mohr from the family crest of the original brewery founder Josef Mohr, who had the literal depiction of his last name, namely an African, incorporated into the logo. The Mohrenbräu brewery argues that it has been using the logo for almost 200 years. The brewery further states that the crest is based on early depictions of Saint Maurice.

Due to the rising awareness of racism in 2020, the discussion about the Mohrenbräu's logo has been reignited. More than 6,000 people signed a petition to keep the depiction of the African as part of the logo, Mohrenbräu's arguments for keeping the logo being tradition as well as the lack of racist intention.

== Mohren Biererlebniswelt ==
The Mohren Biererlebniswelt is a museum about the history of the Mohrenbrauerei and the art of brewing in general. It was opened on 22 October 2016. The museum is located at the headquarters of the Mohrenbrauerei in Dornbirn. There are about 10,000 exhibits on display, from small as beer coasters to a replica of the facade of the former inn "Zum Mohren" or a brewery from the 19th century.
