= Brauerei Egg =

Brewery in Egg, Vorarlberg, Austria

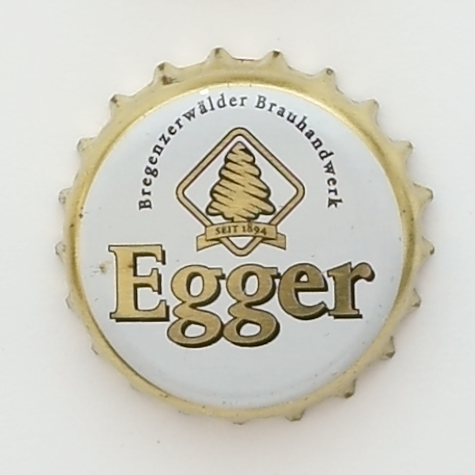
- Location: Egg, Vorarlberg, Austria
- Opened: 1894
- Key people: Dominik Lissek (master brewer)(since 2020)
- Owned by: Lukas Dorner (since 2019)
- Employees: 25 (2020)
- Website: www.brauerei-egg.at

The Brauerei Egg, Simma, Kohler GmbH & Co. KG is a brewery in Egg in Vorarlberg (Austria). It was established in 1894. The Egg Brauerei is the smallest private brewery in Vorarlberg.

The first beer was tapped in the brewery on March 24, 1894.

In addition to beer specialties, the company also produces lemonade.

During the COVID-19 pandemic, 20 out of 25 employees had to be put on Kurzarbeit. 15,000 litres of beer could not be sold and had to be destroyed.

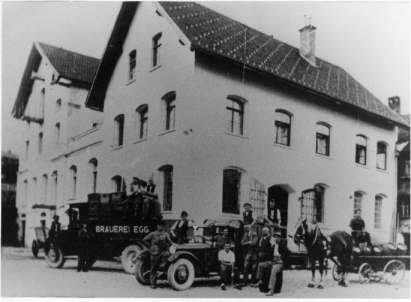
The brewery in 1894
