= Dornbirn =

- Municipality
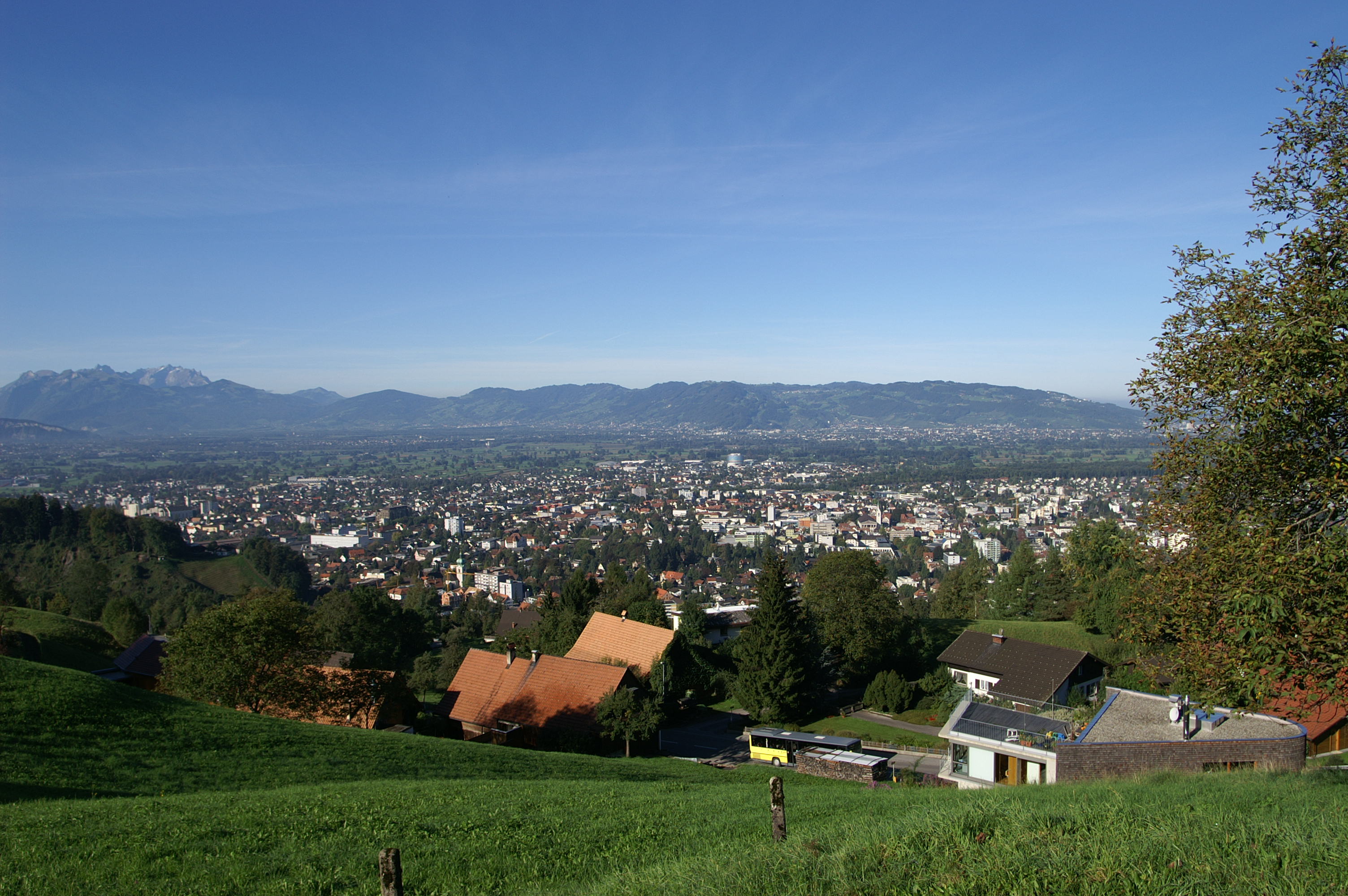

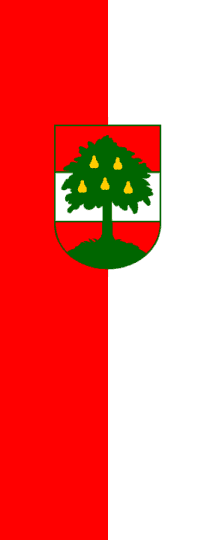
- Flag Coat of arms

- Location of Dornbirn within Vorarlberg

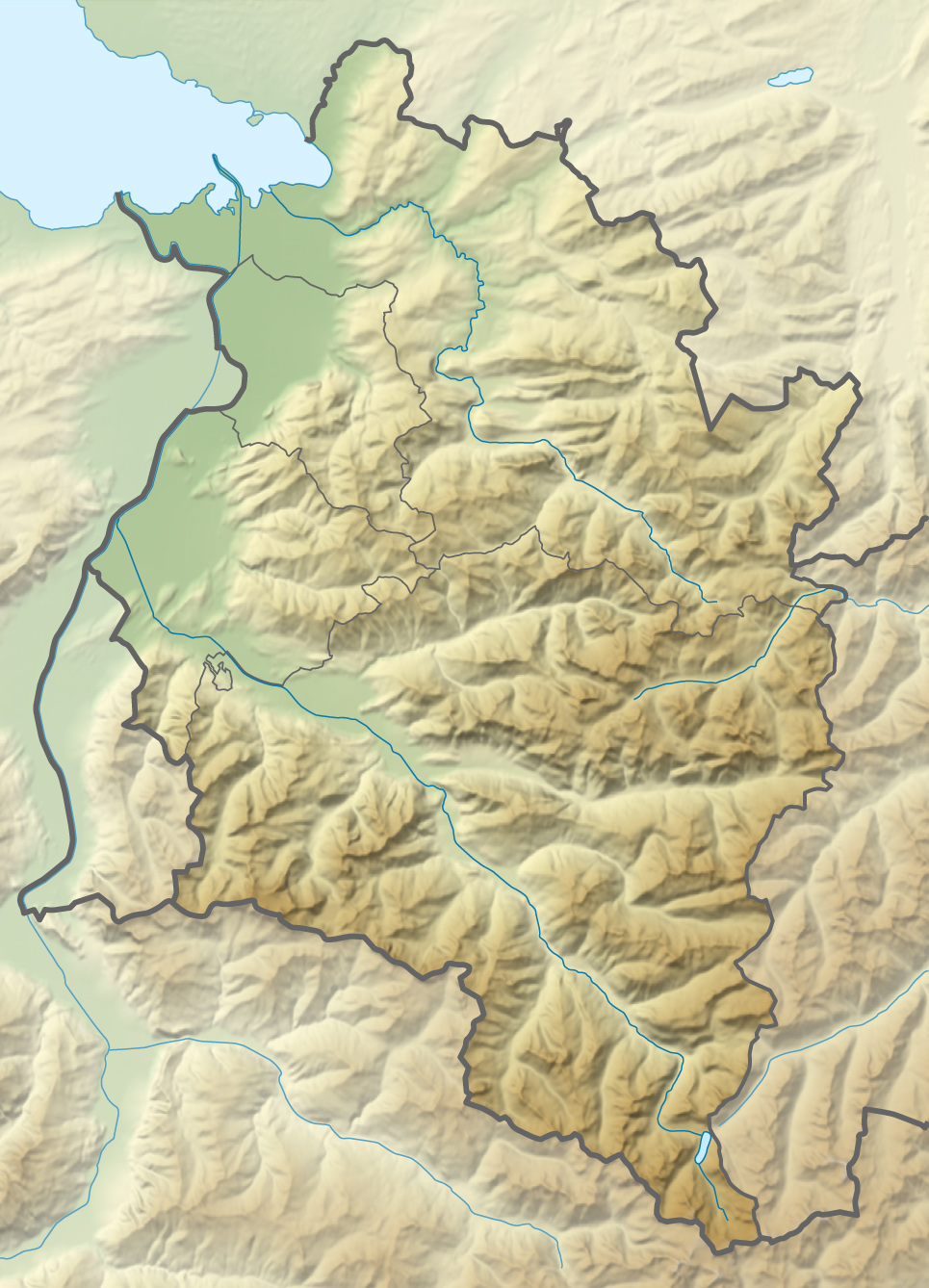
- Location within Vorarlberg Location within Austria
- Coordinates: 47°24′50″N 09°44′40″E
- Country: Austria
- State: Vorarlberg
- District: Dornbirn

Government
  - Mayor: Markus Fäßler (SPÖ)

Area
  - Total: 120.93 km^{2} (46.69 sq mi)
- Elevation: 437 m (1,434 ft)

Population (2016-01-01)
  - Total: 48,067
  - Density: 397.48/km^{2} (1,029.5/sq mi)
- Time zone: UTC+1 (CET)
  - Summer (DST): UTC+2 (CEST)
- Postal code: 6850
- Area code: 05572
- Vehicle registration: DO
- Website: www.dornbirn.at

Dornbirn (Austrian German pronunciation: [ˈdɔrnbɪrn]) is a city in the westernmost Austrian state of Vorarlberg. It is the administrative centre for the district of Dornbirn, which also includes the town of Hohenems, and the market town Lustenau.

Dornbirn is the largest city in Vorarlberg and the tenth largest city in Austria. It is an important commercial and shopping centre.

== Geography ==
=== Location ===
Dornbirn is located at 437 metres above sea level in the Alpine Rhine Valley, at the foot of the Karren mountain, part of the Bregenz Forest Mountain chain at the edge of the Eastern Alps. It is near the borders to Switzerland, Germany and Liechtenstein. The Dornbirner Ach river flows through the town and later into Lake Constance.

=== Municipal structure ===
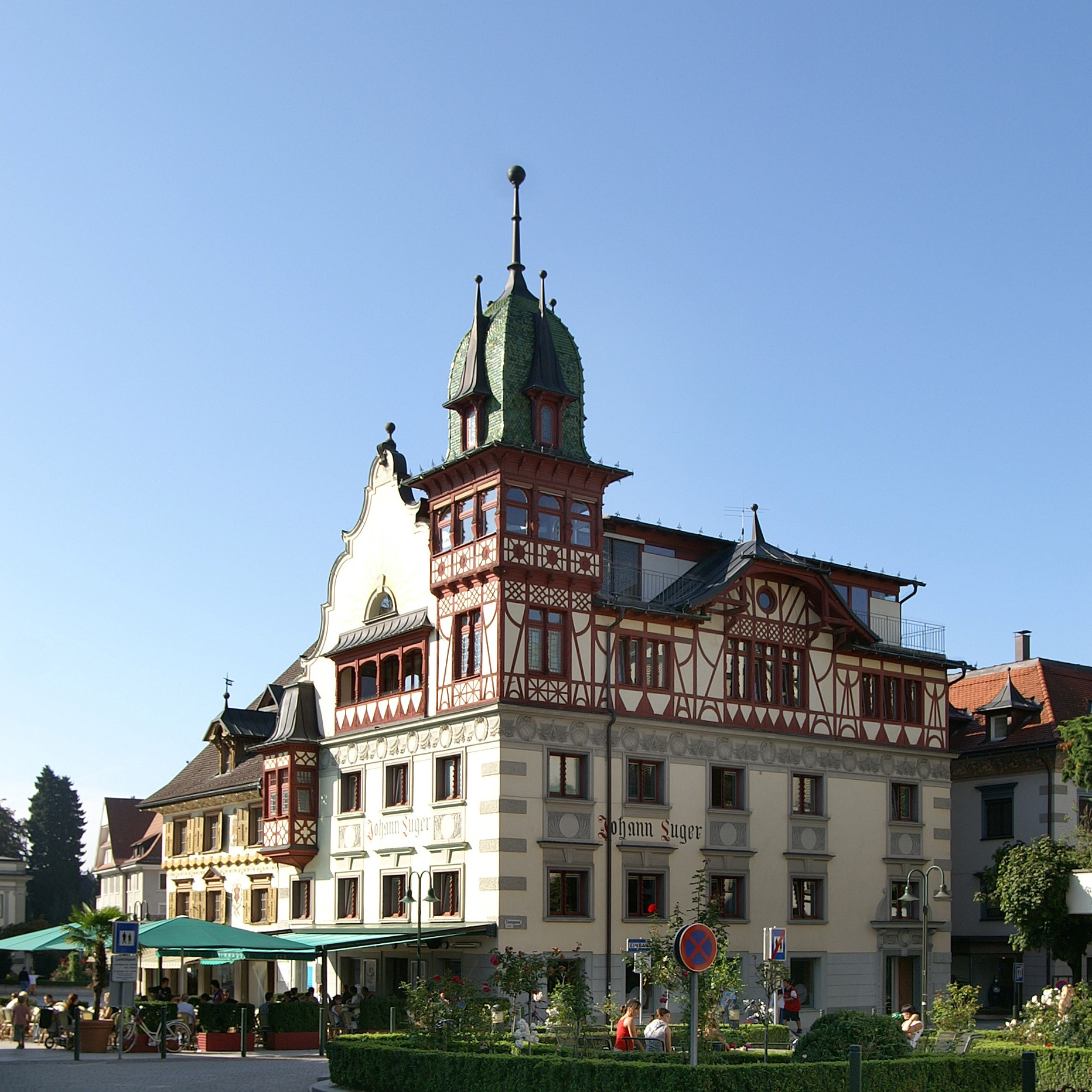
Marktplatz

Dornbirn once consisted only of four "quarters" or precincts: Markt, Hatlerdorf, Oberdorf and Haselstauden. By the 20th century, two new precincts to the west were formed: Rohrbach (formerly a part of Markt) and Schoren (formerly a part of Hatlerdorf), thus bringing the total number of precincts to six.

=== Neighbouring municipalities ===
The town of Dornbirn itself constitutes almost 70% of the surface of the district Dornbirn and borders on numerous other municipalities: Hohenems and Lustenau, 15 municipalities of the Bregenz District: (Lauterach, Wolfurt, Schwarzach, Bildstein, Alberschwende, Schwarzenberg, Reuthe, Mellau, Damüls), and four of the Feldkirch District: (Laterns, Zwischenwasser, Viktorsberg, Fraxern).

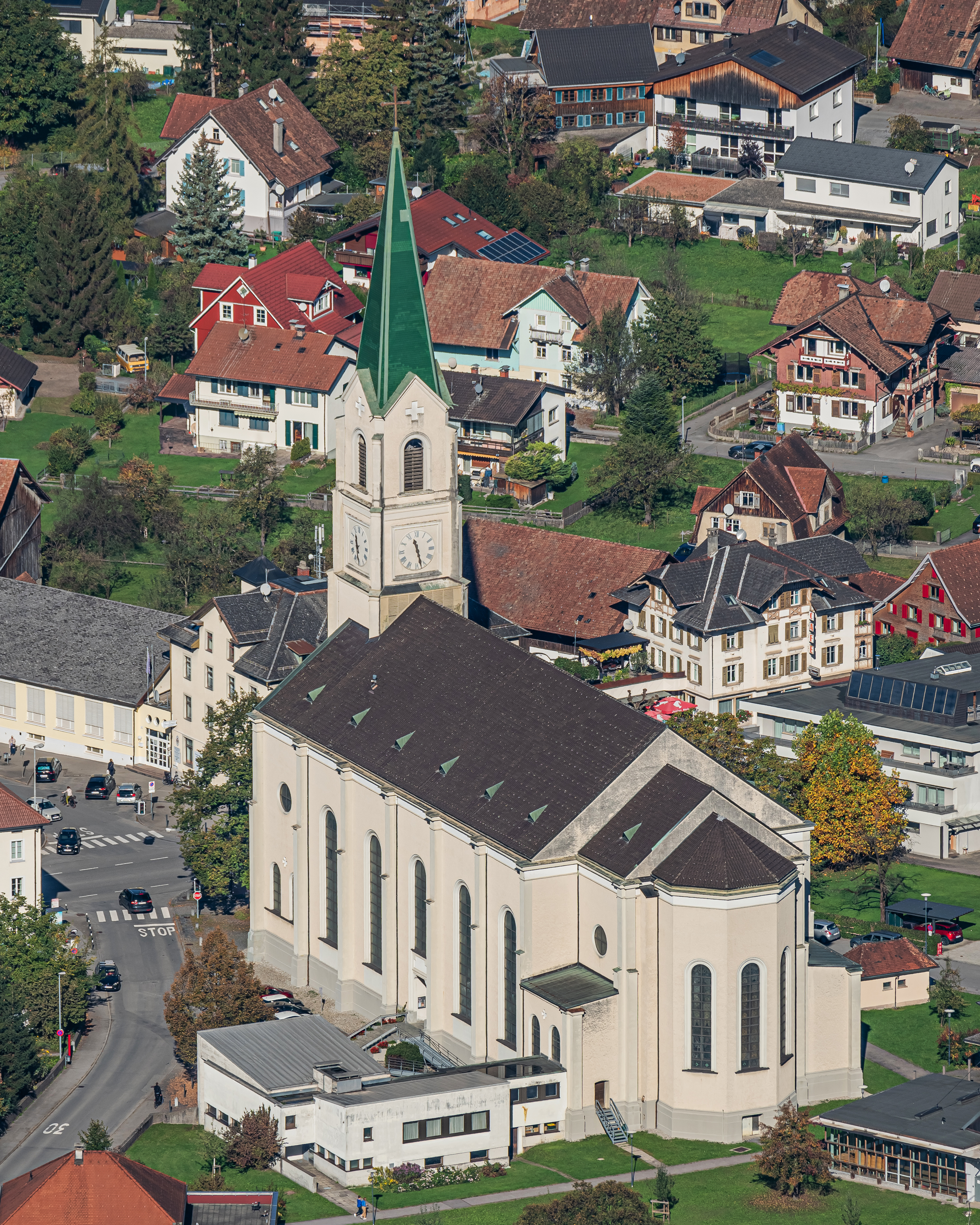
Dornbirn, St.-Leopold-church

== History ==
The earliest evidence of human presence in the Dornbirn area dates from the Mesolithic era. The name "Dornbirn" derives from 'torrin puirron', meaning the 'Settlement of Torro' (the name of an Alemannic farmer living there), and thus has nothing to do with "pears" (German "Birnen"), although this fruit is prominently portrayed on the town emblem. 'Torrin puirron' is mentioned for the first time in 895, in a document from St. Gallen (Switzerland).

Dornbirn became part of the Habsburg Monarchy in 1380. In 1793 it was elevated to a market community. It was not given municipal status until 1901. In 1932 the mountain village of Ebnit was annexed. In 1969 Dornbirn became the seat of the new Dornbirn district administrative authority.

=== Historic marginalia ===
1881: the first telephone service in the K&K empire was inaugurated by Emperor Franz Joseph I of Austria on August 10, 1881.

== Population ==
Historical population
| Year | Pop. | ±% |
|---|---|---|
| 1869 | 8,707 | — |
| 1880 | 9,464 | +8.7% |
| 1890 | 10,810 | +14.2% |
| 1900 | 13,193 | +22.0% |
| 1910 | 16,320 | +23.7% |
| 1923 | 14,481 | −11.3% |
| 1934 | 16,650 | +15.0% |
| 1939 | 17,572 | +5.5% |
| 1951 | 22,532 | +28.2% |
| 1961 | 28,075 | +24.6% |
| 1971 | 35,113 | +25.1% |
| 1981 | 38,641 | +10.0% |
| 1991 | 40,735 | +5.4% |
| 2001 | 42,301 | +3.8% |
| 2011 | 45,605 | +7.8% |
| 2014 | 46,883 | +2.8% |
| 2017 | 49,090 | +4.7% |

Largest groups of foreign residents
| Nationality | Population (2026) |
|---|---|
| Germany | 2401 |
| Turkey | 1904 |
| Afghanistan | 652 |
| Romania | 682 |
| Syria | 652 |
| Serbia | 568 |
| Croatia | 501 |
| Russian Federation | 466 |
| Bosnia and Herzegovina | 444 |
| Ukraine | 424 |
| Bulgaria | 347 |
| Hungary | 345 |
| Italy | 267 |
| Slovakia | 182 |
| Poland | 145 |
| Slovenia | 112 |
| Iraq | 75 |
| Iran | 74 |
| Kosovo | 72 |
| Czechia | 63 |
| North Macedonia | 32 |

== Politics ==
=== Municipal Council ===
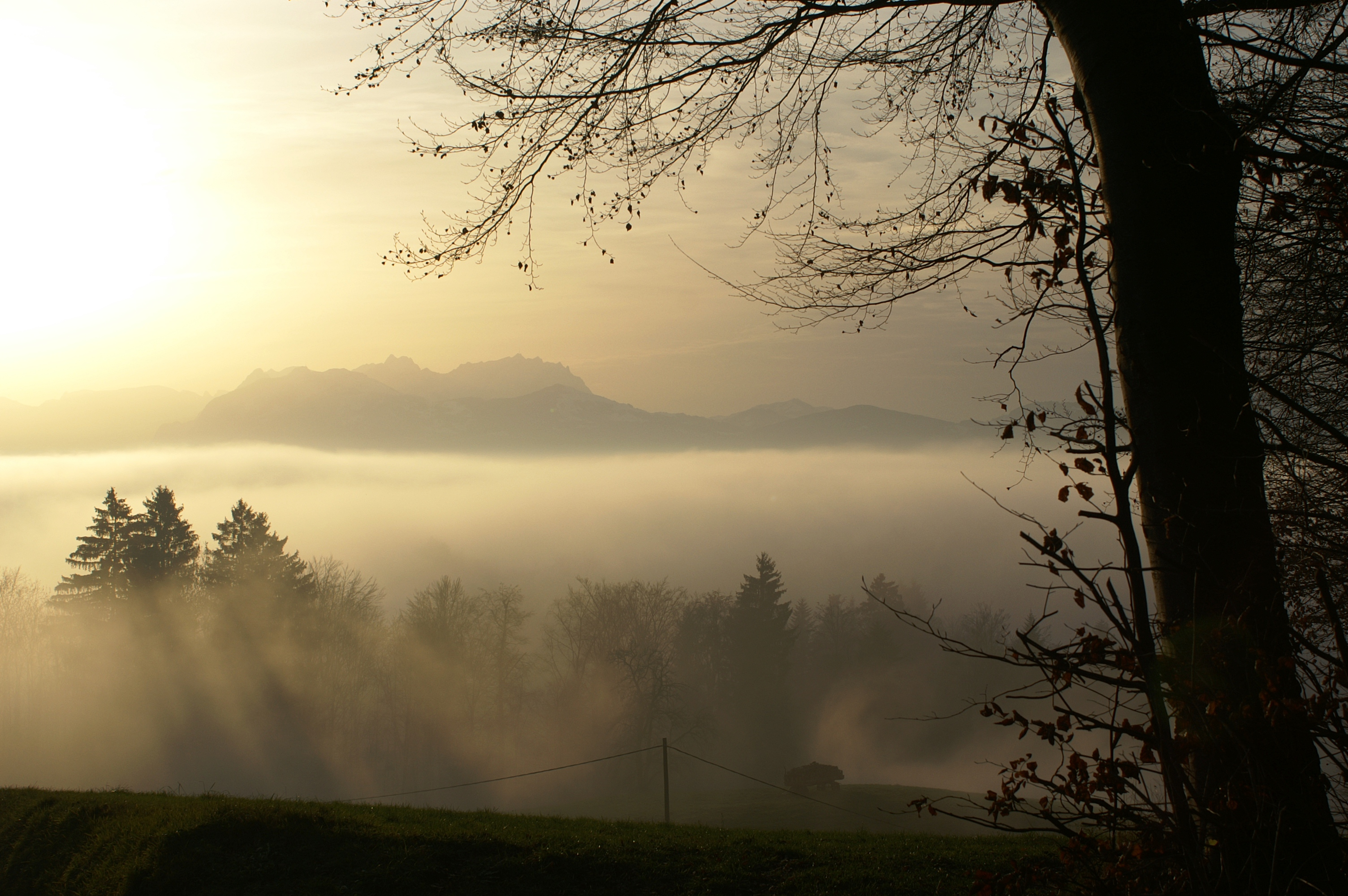
Dornbirn Rädermacher

The Dornbirn Municipal Council has 36 seats and the following party mandates:

- 13 Austrian People's Party (ÖVP)
- 8 Freedom Party of Austria (FPÖ)
- 7 Social Democratic Party of Austria (SPÖ)
- 6 The Greens – The Green Alternative (Die Grünen)
- 2 NEOS - The New Austria and Liberal Forum (NEOS)

The current mayor (since 2013) is Markus Fäßler (SPÖ). The current vice-mayor is Alexander Juen (ÖVP). The city council consists of 9 council members (including mayor and vice-mayor). and the following party mandates:

- 4 Austrian People's Party (ÖVP)
- 2 Freedom Party of Austria (FPÖ)
- 2 Social Democratic Party of Austria (SPÖ)
- 1 The Greens – The Green Alternative (Die Grünen)

=== International relations ===
Dornbirn has town partnerships with

- Kecskemét, Hungary
- Sélestat, France
- Dubuque, Iowa, United States

== Culture ==
=== Museums ===
The City Museum Dornbirn is Dornbirn's local museum, specialized in the city's history, early photography, traditional crafts, agriculture and the formerly flourishing textile industry.

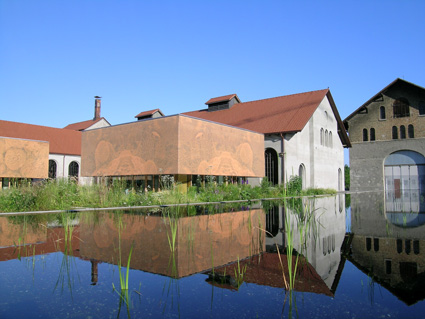
Inatura

Inatura is an interactive natural history museum. The museum includes a documentation center about nature in Vorarlberg, along with an interactive exhibition.

The Mohren Biererlebniswelt is a beer museum of Vorarlberg's oldest brewery Mohrenbrauerei. It shows traditional brewery equipment and gives insights in the history of beer brewing. Additionally, it hosts workshops on beer.

The Rolls-Royce Museum is a privately owned automobile museum. It is said to have the world's largest collection of Rolls-Royce cars.

ART BODENSEE is an annual meeting point for artists, art collectors, and connoisseurs. Since 2001, it has included exhibits of works by international artists.

The FLATZ Museum sees itself as a forum concerned with artistic impulses and contemporary cultural positions. It shows changing exhibitions designed by international guest curators, with a focus on photographic art; it organises readings, lecture series, discussions and performances.

=== Architecture ===
Dornbirn's Messestadion is an indoor sporting arena, and home to the local ice hockey team.

An example of modern Vorarlberg architecture is the LifeCycle-Tower ONE (LCT ONE), an innovative architectural project concerned with environmental and energy efficiency. With its eight floors, it is the first modular wooden hybrid complex; it was built in 2012.

Also the public library shows various architectural details, such as ceramic bricks reminding us of book shelves, or a path, which is reminiscent of the existing "beaten track" between Schulgasse and Jahngasse, and leads through the building allowing it to be experienced as a public space. The public swimming pool was renovated in 2005 and received various prices for its architecture.

== Economy ==
Vorarlberg's regional studio of the ORF (Austrian Broadcasting Corporation) is located in Dornbirn.

Zumtobel Group is an ATX traded company, one of many firms based in Dornbirn. The town was formerly a major centre of the textile industry, which suffered a serious decline beginning in the 1980s.

The Mohrenbrauerei August Huber is Vorarlberg's oldest brewery and market leader in the gastronomy and retail sectors.

== Transport ==
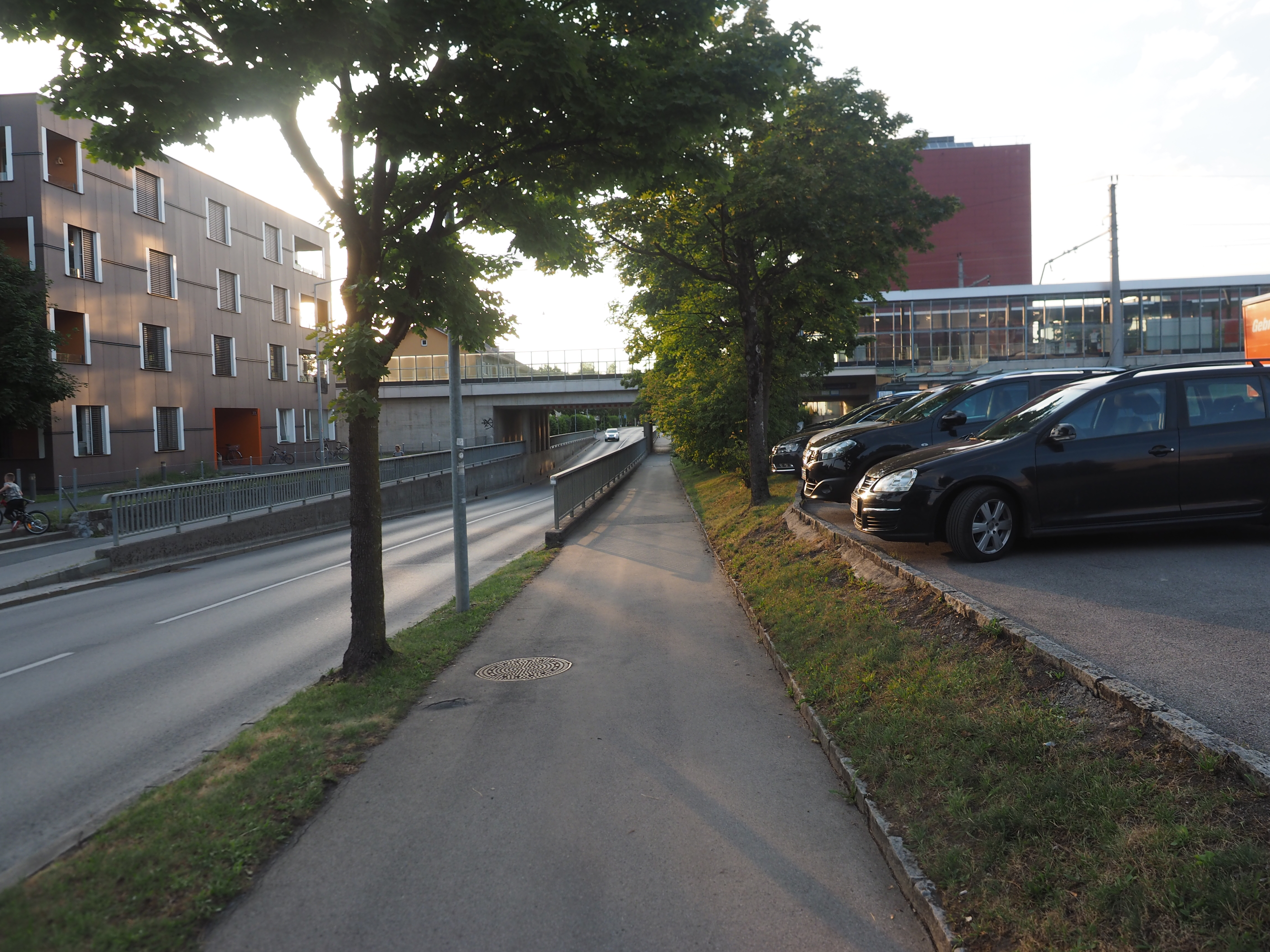
A view of Höchsterstraße in Schoren. The Dornbirn Schoren railway station is visible in the background on the right.

Located in the middle of the Rhine valley, Dornbirn is an important junction of regional and interregional bus lines, connecting Bregenz to the north, Feldkirch to the south, and the Bregenz Forest to the east. The A14 Rheintal motorway (Autobahn) passes by to the west. The Achrain tunnel, opened in 2009, directly connects Dornbirn/Haselstauden with the Bregenz Forest - Alberschwende region. The town has a network of municipal buses.

There are four railway stations in the municipality of Dornbirn: Dornbirn, Dornbirn-Schoren, Hatlerdorf and Haselstauden, all situated on the Vorarlberg railway line of ÖBB. Dornbirn railway station is an important stop for trains between western and eastern Austria.

Hohenems-Dornbirn Airfield, a small airport, is located at nearby Hohenems. The nearest passenger airports are St. Gallen–Altenrhein Airport, located 27 km (17 mi) north west and Zurich Airport, located 125 km (78 mi) west of Dornbirn.

== Education ==
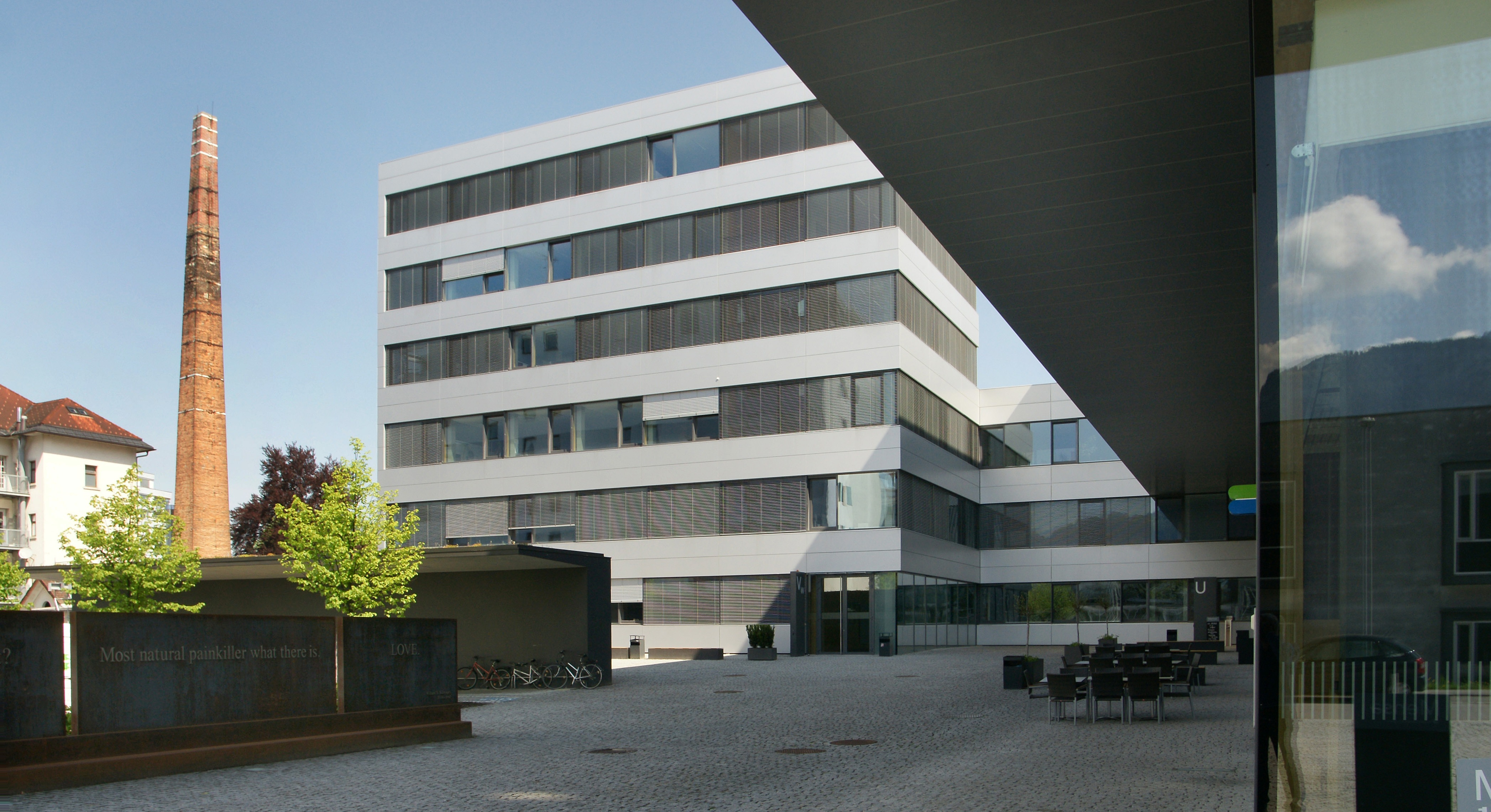
University of Applied Sciences Vorarlberg

Educational institutions in Dornbirn include the Vorarlberg University of Applied Sciences, two general education secondary schools, and a higher technical vocational college (Höhere Technische Lehranstalt).

The Vorarlberg University of Applied Sciences (German: Fachhochschule Vorarlberg) was originally founded as a school for technology in 1989. It achieved the status of an officially recognized university in 1999. It currently offers bachelor's and master's degrees in the fields of Business, Engineering & Technology, Design, and Social Work.

== Sports ==
Among the most important sports institutions in Dornbirn is the RHC Dornbirn, one of the most powerful Austrian Rink Hockey teams. In 2010 it hosted the 2010 Rink Hockey Men's B World Championship.

The Baseball & Softball Club Dornbirn was founded in 1990, and has won the Austrian national title twice. BSC Dornbirn consists of one youth team, two men's teams, and two women's teams.

Dornbirn hosted the World Gymnaestrada event in 2007 and 2019.

== The Mohrenbrauerei (Mohren brewery) ==
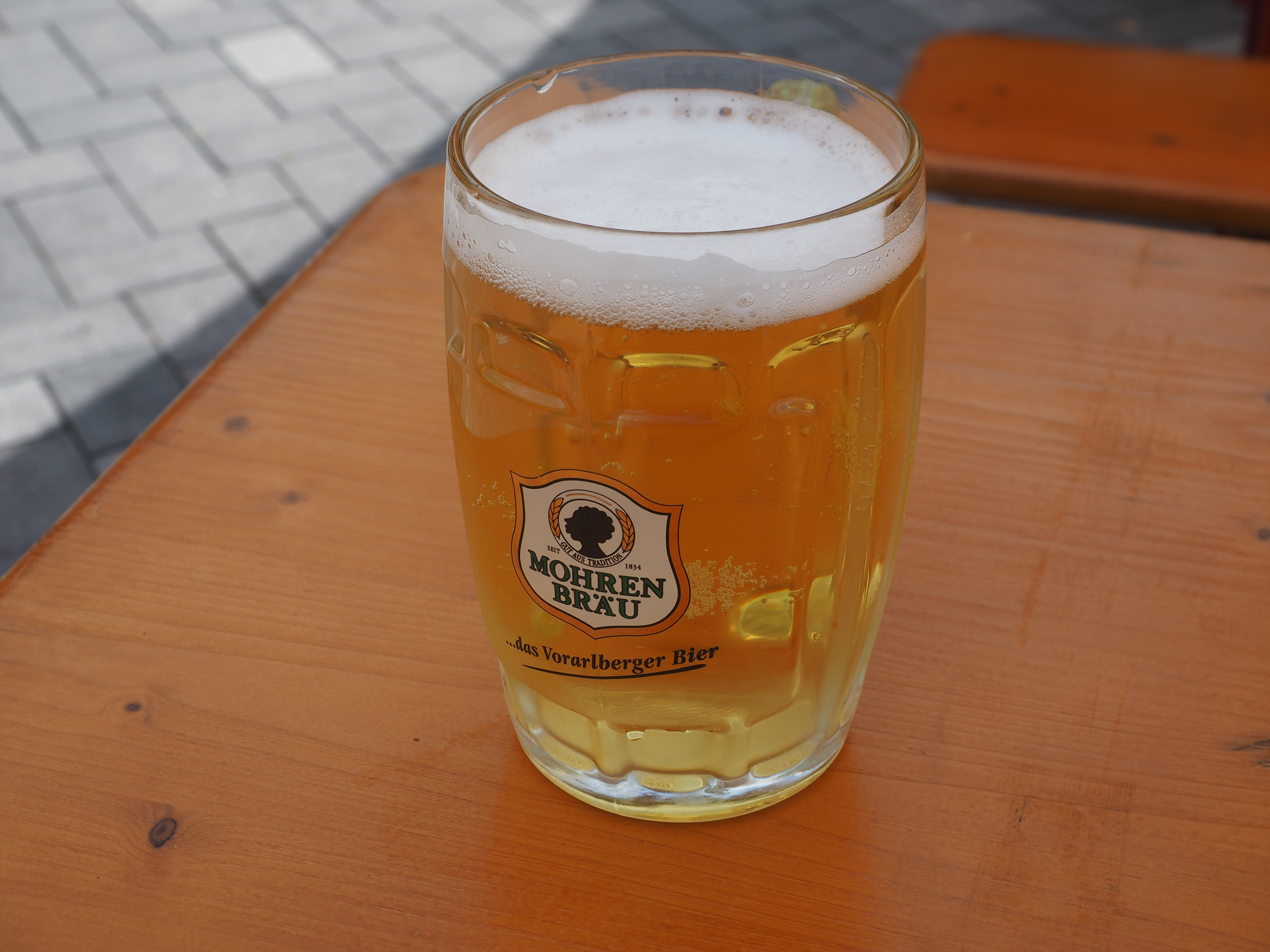
Glass of Mohrenbräu beer

The Mohrenbrauerei was founded in Dornbirn in 1834, which makes it the oldest operating brewery in Vorarlberg.

== Notable people ==
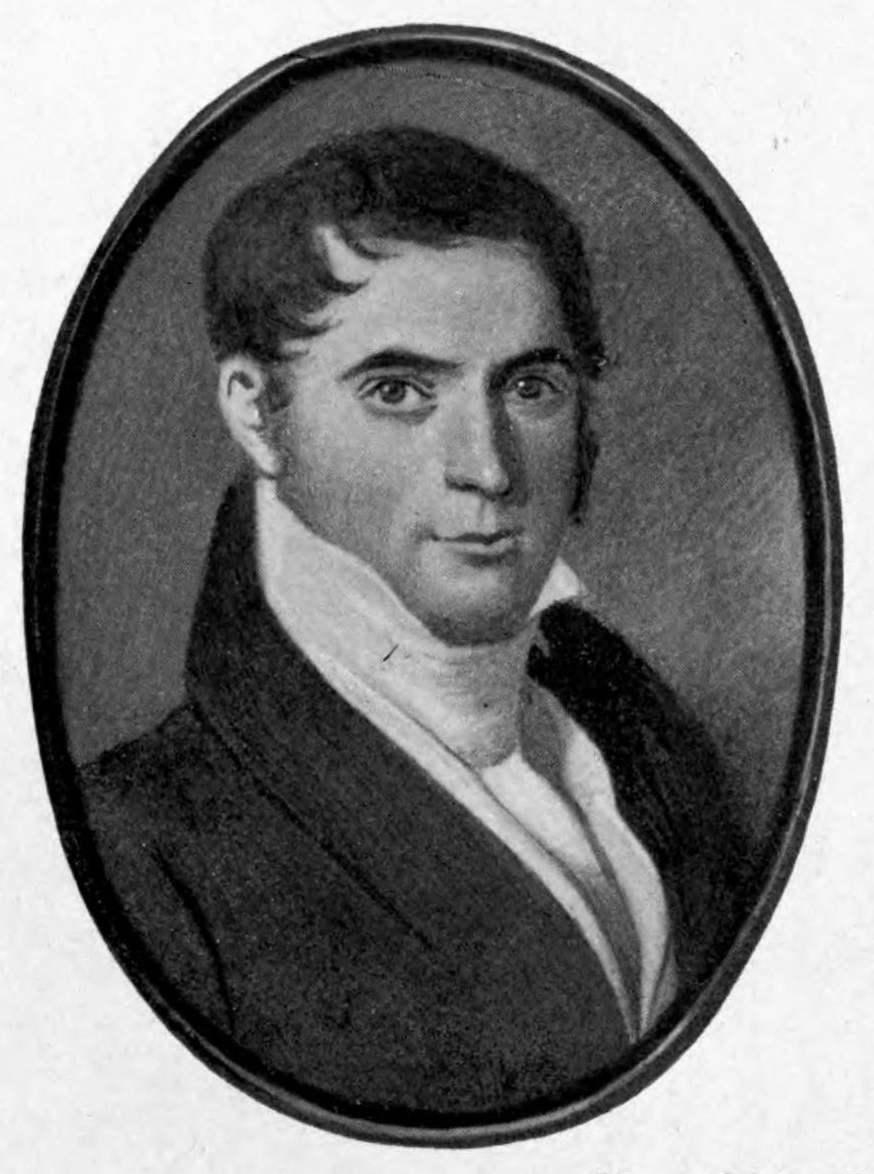
Francis Martin Drexel, self portrait

- Joseph Anton Rhomberg (1786–1853), German painter, illustrator and graphic artist
- Francis Martin Drexel (1792–1863), Philadelphia banker and artist
- Johann Georg Waibel, (DE Wiki) (1828–1908), Mayor of Dornbirn 1869–1908, member of the Austrian Reichsrat and Landtag
- Joseph Bobleter (1846–1909), American newspaper editor and politician
- Karl Aubert Salzmann (1876–1934), president of Federal Council (Austria), 1926/1927
- Wolfgang Blenk (1926–1996), politician (Nazi Party, Austrian People's Party)
- Margret Dünser (1926–1980), journalist
- Wolfgang Rümmele, (DE Wiki) (1946–2019), Mayor of Dornbirn 1999-2013
- Elfi Graf (born 1952), Schlager music singer
- Eva Maria Waibel (born 1953), high school teacher and former ÖVP politician
- Tobias G. Natter (born 1961), Austrian art historian
- Aaron Pilsan (born 1995), Austrian classical pianist
- Günter Vetter (1936–2022), Austrian politician, member of the Vorarlberg state council
- Reinold Geiger (born 1947), Austrian businessman

=== Sport ===
- Karl Cordin (born 1948), ski racer
- Ingrid Eberle (born 1957), ski racer
- Yvonne Meusburger Garamszegi (born 1983), WTA tennis player
- Eva Pinkelnig (born 1988), ski jumper
- Tamira Paszek (born 1990), WTA tennis player
- Deniz Mujić (born 1990), Austrian footballer of Bosnian descent with over 280 club caps

== Twin towns – sister cities ==
Dornbirn is twinned with:

- Dubuque, United States
- Kecskemét, Hungary
- Sélestat, France

| Preceded by Lisbon, Portugal (2003) | World Gymnaestrada host city 2007 | Succeeded by Lausanne, Switzerland (2011) |
| Preceded by Helsinki, Finland (2015) | World Gymnaestrada host city 2019 | Succeeded by Amsterdam, Netherlands (2023) |
