= Egg Museum =

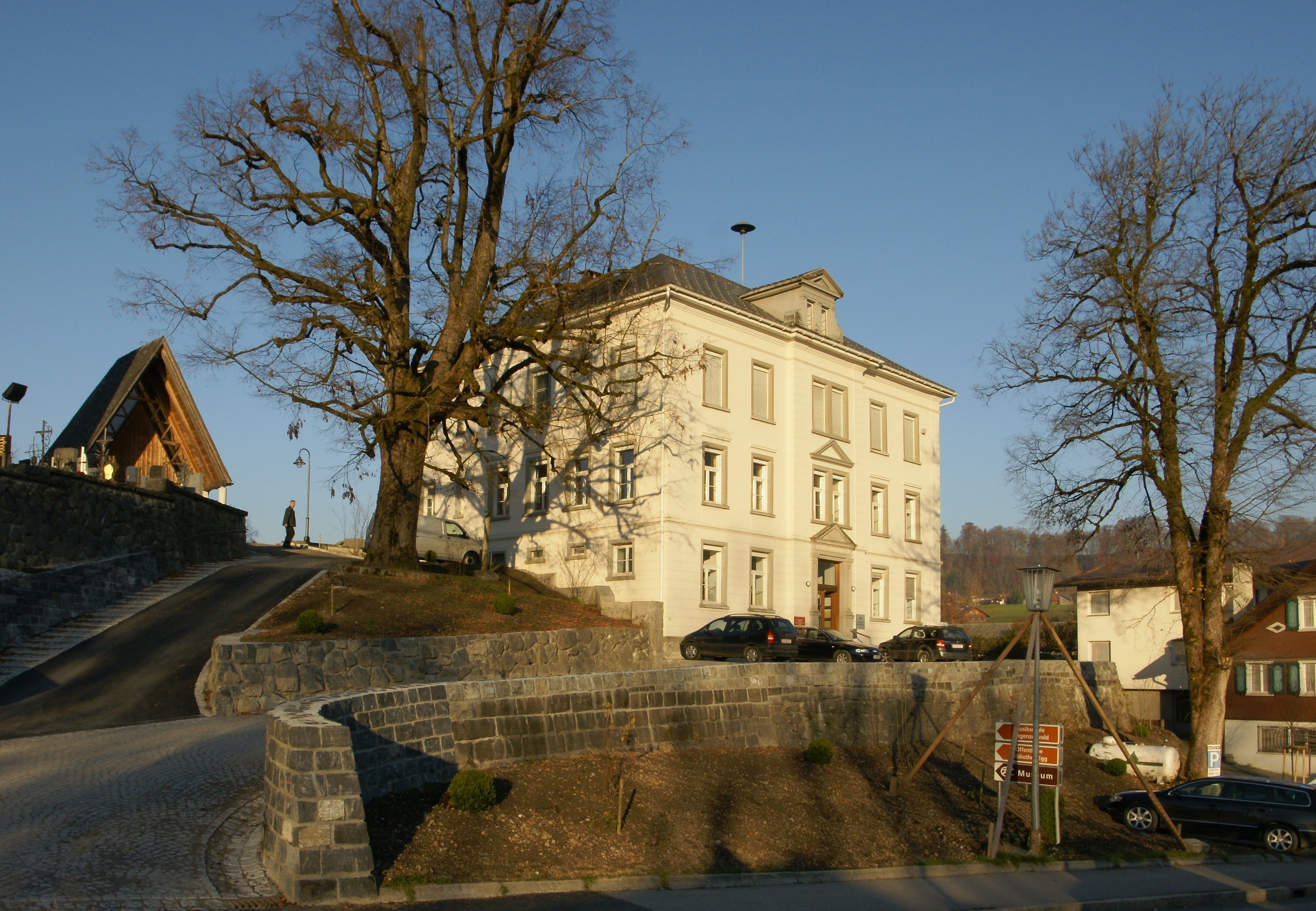
- Former name: VLM – Vorarlberger Landesmuseum
- Established: 1904
- Location: Egg, Austria, Vorarlberg, Austria
- Coordinates: 47.4317°N 9.8959°E
- Type: Local history
- Collection size: 3,000
- Director: Andreas Hammerer
- Website: https://egg-museum.jimdosite.com/

The Egg Museum is a local history museum located in Egg in the Austrian state of Vorarlberg. It is the oldest regional museum in Vorarlberg. The museum was founded in 1904 and reopened again in 1988.

The museum's collection is centred around the Bregenz Forest region, focussing on traditional Bregenz Forest garb. Additionally, there are exhibits on agriculture, practices, customs and culture like ceramics, weapons, baptismal and charity gifts. A model of a typical Bregenz Forest house gives insight into the former living culture of the Bregenz Forest people. A small part of the exhibition is dedicated to the celebration of 100 years of the Wälderbähnle.

The museum features two special exhibitions each year, for example "The Bregenz Forest during WWI" (2014) or "FM.Felder" (2019).

== See also ==
- List of museums in Vorarlberg
