= Deniz Mujić =

Austrian footballer

Personal information
- Date of birth: 7 August 1990 (age 36)
- Place of birth: Dornbirn, Austria
- Height: 1.84 m (6 ft 0 in)
- Positions: Forward; attacking midfielder

Team information
- Current team: Eschen/Mauren
- Number: 9

Youth career
- 1997–2007: FC Dornbirn

Senior career*
Years	Team	Apps	(Gls)
2007–2010	FC Dornbirn	76	(15)
2010–2012	Bayern Munich II	23	(0)
2012	FC Pasching	14	(3)
2012–2013	FC Dornbirn	13	(9)
2013	Schwarz-Weiß Bregenz	13	(9)
2014–2017	FC St. Gallen II	40	(23)
2016	→ FC Schaffhausen (loan)	18	(11)
2016–2017	→ FC Chiasso (loan)	25	(6)
2017–2018	FC Balzers	14	(4)
2018	FC Gossau	13	(3)
2019–2021	Dornbirn	46	(9)
2021–2022	Brühl	13	(1)
2022–	Eschen/Mauren	7	(2)

International career
2009–2010	Austria U-20	7	(0)
- * Club domestic league appearances and goals as of 5 October 2022

Deniz Mujić (born 7 August 1990) is an Austrian footballer of Bosnian descent who plays as a midfielder or forward for Liechtensteiner club Eschen/Mauren.

== Career ==
In January 2014, he joined the reserve team of FC St. Gallen. On 8 January 2016, je joined FC Schaffhausenj on loan until the end of the 2015–16 season. On 29 July 2016, he extended his contract at FC St. Gallen until 2018 and was loaned to FC Chiasso for the 2016–17 season.

Mujic signed with FC Gossau in the summer of 2018.

In June 2022, Mujić moved to Eschen/Mauren in Liechtenstein, the club that plays in the Swiss league system, specifically in the fourth-tier 1. Liga at that time.
