= Margret Dünser =

- Born: 27 July 1926; Dornbirn, Austria
- Died: 5 June 1980 (aged 53); Basel, Switzerland
- Known for: Journalist and author

Margret Dünser (27 July 1926 – 5 June 1980) was an Austrian journalist known for her work on those living the High Society lifestyle and who wrote the book High Life as well as Königs- und Fürstenhäuser heute.

== Personal life ==
Dünser was born in Dornbirn, Vorarlberg. She died on June 5, 1980, in Basel, Switzerland.

== Career ==
Her West German TV show, V.I.P.-Schaukel, aired between 1971 and 1980, was watched, at its peak, by about thirty million people, in Germany. Her excellent journalistic skills and captivating personality made her one of the most respected journalists in the industry. Dünser's career began in Austria in the late 1940s. She started working for various newspapers, including the Vorarlberger Nachrichten, where she worked as a culture editor. She later moved to Switzerland, where she continued to work as a journalist. However, it was her work in West Germany that brought her to the forefront of the journalistic world. In 1971, she started hosting a television program called "V.I.P.-Schaukel." The show became an instant hit and ran for nine seasons. During its peak, the program attracted a staggering thirty million viewers in Germany.

The show featured interviews with some of the most influential people in society, including politicians, celebrities, and members of the royal family. Dünser's interviewing style was unique, and her ability to connect with her guests made her an instant hit with audiences. She was confident, articulate, and had a natural ability to make her guests feel at ease. Dünser was also known for her insightful questions, which often revealed new aspects of her guest's personalities. Aside from her television work, Dünser was also an accomplished author. Her book, High Life, was an account of the lives of the rich and famous. The book was a bestseller.

== Interviews ==
- 1971/72: Gina Lollobrigida / Orson Welles / Daliah Lavi / Curd Jürgens / Gunter Sachs / Bob Hope / Raquel Welch / Marquis Xavier de Sade /Peter Ustinov / Jerry Lewis / Zsa Zsa Gabor / Tony Curtis / Rhonda Fleming / Carroll Righter, Astrologer / Sammy Davis jr. / Hugh Hefner / Alfred Hitchcock / Henry Fonda / Hildegard Knef / Kim Novak / Antony Armstrong-Jones, 1. Earl of Snowdon / Roger Moore / Diana Rigg / Kirk Douglas / Kurt Waldheim
- 1973: Stewart Granger /Prince Reza Pahlavi /Prince Ali-Reza Pahlavi/ Queen Sirikit / King Bhumibol of Thailand / Anthony Quinn / Maharaja of Jaipur, India / William Amherst Vanderbilt Cecil / Peter Fonda / Rita Hayworth
- 1974: Jolie Gabor / Eva Gabor / Magda Gabor / Zsa Zsa Gabor / Rachele Mussolini, widow of Benito Mussolini / Tennessee Williams / Truman Capote
- 1975: Baron Philippe de Rothschild / Paul Bocuse, French Chef / Malcolm Forbes trade magazine publishers / Richard Smart, Viticulturalist / Ronald Reagan / Nancy Reagan / Rock Hudson / Jay J. Armes / John Russell, 13. Duke of Bedford, and wife / Edith Head / Telly Savalas / John Carras
- 1976: Bette Davis / Jehan Sadat / F. Lee Bailey, lawyer/ Siegfried & Roy / Sir Edmund Hillary, mountaineer & explorer / Gregory Peck, Actor / Marcello Mastroianni, Actor / Rudolf Nurejew, conductor / Sarah Caldwell / Osman Ahmed Osman, Former Minister of Housing of Egypt
- 1977: John Spencer-Churchill, 11. Duke of Marlborough / Ivo Pitanguy, Brazilian plastic surgeon / Joanne Herring, philanthropist / Hans Stern, Brazilian businessman / Oscar Niemeyer, Architect/ Endre Szász, Hungarian painter and illustrator / John Osborne, Screenwriter / Arnold Schwarzenegger / Robert David Lion Gardiner / Woody Allen / Jacques Tati, Film Maker/ Lillian Carter, mother of Jimmy Carter / Catherine Deneuve, actress / John Connally
- 1978: Henry Miller / Michael Caine / Mildred Mary Bruce, aviator / Alexander Fermor-Hesketh, 3. Baron Hesketh, Former Minister of State for Trade and Industry of United Kingdom / Telly Savalas, Actor / Roger Moore, Actor / Richard Burton, Actor / Edward Heath / Harold Wilson / Henry Herbert, 7. Earl of Carnarvon, Former Hereditary peer of the United Kingdom / Cantinflas comedian & actor / Louis de Funès, comedian / Eugène Ionesco, playwriter / Rodica Ionesco / Hope Hampton, Actress / Maximilian Schell, Actor / Gene Hackman, Actor / Frank Borman, Astronaut & chairman of Eastern Air Lines / Steve Guttenberg, Actor
- 1979: Vincent Price / Salvador Dalí, Artist / David Shepherd, artist / James Stewart / Burt Reynolds, Actor / Marjoe Gortner / Norton Winfred Simon / Clifford Irving / Peter Falk, Actor
- 1980: Dustin Hoffman / Robert Redford, Actor/ John Ehrlichman, Politician
- Unknown year: Sophia Loren / Chief Dan George, Actor / Willard F. Rockwell / Anthony Perkins / Patrick Anson, 5. Earl of Lichfield
