= Building life cycle =

Building life cycle is the view of a building over the course of its entire life, viewing it not just as an operational building, but taking into account the design, construction, operation, demolition and waste treatment. The study of the entire impact of a building on its environment has become a de facto requirement for construction in most jurisdictions, owing to the resource-intensive nature of construction. Life cycle analysis considers various aspects of resource utilization in a building, for example, overall energy conservation. Current research is focused on exploring methods of incorporating a whole life cycle view of buildings. It is considered a subset of life-cycle analysis.

== History ==
The concept of life cycle analysis evolved since the concept was initially considered in the 1970s and 1980s, when life cycle studies focused on the quantifying the energy and raw resources used by a building, and the load on the sewerage and sanitation systems imposed by waste generated in the building, during the operational life of the structure. Since then, the methods of analysis have evolved, and presently comprise four stages: goal and scope definition, life cycle inventory analysis, life cycle impact assessment and life cycle interpretation. In the period from 2000 to 2014, studies on sustainable building strategies, for example, energy consumption, specific components of construction, materials, environmental impacts of building subsystems, integrated renewable energy systems, and electrical and thermal systems have been conducted, with the number of publications rising monotonically.

== Life cycle stages ==
Building life cycle assessments commonly follow the framework of the European standard, which groups a building's life into four sets of information modules: product and construction (module A), use (module B), end of life (module C), and benefits and loads beyond the system boundary (module D). Module A includes: raw material supply, transport, manufacturing and on-site construction. Module B includes: operational energy, water use, maintenance, repair, replacement, and refurbishment. Module C includes: demolition/deconstruction, waste transport, and disposal. Module D describes the potential positive and negatives of reusing or recovering energy from materials beyond the building's life, as this has both risks and benefits.

== Embodied and operational impacts ==
The life cycle assessment of a building is impacted by the operation of buildings. Operation impacts come from energy used while the building is occupied. Embodied impacts come from the energy and materials used during the manufacturing of a building. A review of more than 650 life cycle assessment case studies found that modern improvements to energy performance has reduced overall life cycle greenhouse gas emissions, however the addition of embodied emissions has increased over time. Embodied emissions add up to about 20–25% of life cycle emissions in buildings that meet current energy standards, this is about 45–50% in "highly energy-efficient" buildings, and more than 90% in select and rare cases. Because these emissions arise when the building is produced, there is a spike of emissions at the construction stage of a building.

A review of 102 journal articles noted 17 methods for lowering embodied carbon and concluded that no single strategy is sufficient. Lower-carbon materials, more efficient design, better reuse of carbon-intensive materials and more severe policy constraints, are all mentioned as elements that could lower a buildings carbon footprint. The same review found that most of the life cycle assessments analyzed show only manufacturing stages, meaning the use and end-of-life stages of a building are often not considered.

== Building life extension and material reuse ==
Building life extension can occur through adaptive reuse, which retains and modifies existing structures for new functions, or through material reuse, which recovers building components for incorporation into new construction. While adaptive reuse preserves the structural continuity of an existing building, material reuse extends the service life of individual elements, such as steel, timber, masonry, and façade systems, beyond that of their original structures. Both approaches can reduce reliance on newly manufactured materials and the associated embodied carbon emissions of construction.

The reuse of building components can extend the functional life of construction materials beyond the demolition of their original structures. Rather than processing all demolition waste into new products or disposing of it, selected components can be incorporated into new buildings, potentially reducing the demand for newly manufactured materials and associated embodied environmental impacts.

This process can be seen in Resource Rows, a residential development in Copenhagen designed by Lendager Group. The project incorporates reclaimed timber from construction of the Copenhagen Metro into façades and terraces, alongside waste timber used in interior flooring and salvaged materials incorporated into rooftop garden structures. Rather than dismantling brickwork into individual units, the project reuses larger sections of existing masonry, preserving their original composition and allowing bricks bonded with cement-based mortar to be incorporated into new façades.

== Environmental implications of building life extension ==
The environmental implications of extending a building's service life can be evaluated through life-cycle assessment, which considers the impacts of construction, operation, maintenance, and eventual demolition. Retaining existing structural elements can reduce demand for newly manufactured materials and avoid some embodied carbon emissions associated with replacement construction. However, refurbishment and adaptive reuse introduce additional impacts through material replacement, mechanical upgrades, and continued operational energy consumption. The balance between embodied and operational emissions is particularly significant in older buildings, where improvements to insulation, glazing, and mechanical systems may reduce energy demand while introducing new embodied carbon. The environmental performance of these interventions depends on the condition of the existing structure, the extent of renovation, and its anticipated remaining service life. Life-cycle assessment provides a framework for comparing refurbishment and replacement over a defined assessment period, accounting for both the emissions avoided through structural retention and those generated by subsequent building interventions.

== Supplemental information on end of life in life cycle assessment ==
A 2025 literature review of end-of-life situations for specifically mass timber buildings concluded that there are four overall options: reuse, recycling, energy recovery and landfill. The review suggests that reuse is the most sustainable option, second to re-use was recycling.

== See also ==
- Life cycle analysis
