= Inatura =

Museum in Dornbirn, Vorarlberg, Austria

Inatura – Erlebnis Naturschau Dornbirn
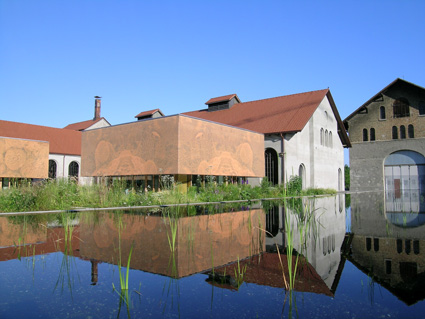
- Pond of the inatura natural spectacle
- Former name: Vorarlberger Naturschau
- Established: 2003
- Location: Dornbirn, Vorarlberg (Austria)
- Type: Natural history
- Website: https://www.inatura.at/english/

The inatura – Nature Experience (German: Inatura – Erlebnis Naturschau Dornbirn) is an interactive natural history museum in Dornbirn, Vorarlberg (Austria). It originated in 2003 from the former "Vorarlberger Naturschau" and was set up on former factory premises in the new Dornbirn City Gardens.

== History ==
The inatura is one of three Vorarlberg state museums. It is the largest and conceptually most modern natural science museum in the Lake Constance region. The museum includes a documentation center dealing with natural science topics and research in Vorarlberg and its surrounding regions and includes various interactive exhibits.

== Architecture ==
Originally, the museum property was the venue for a turbine and hydropower machine factory (Rüsch-Werke), founded by Josef Ignaz Rüsch in 1827. That plant was closed in 1984.

In 1999, the City of Dornbirn and the State of Vorarlberg, along with sponsors of the "Vorarlberger Naturschau", decided to newly conceive and launch a more up-to-date natural history museum. Together with the project partner F.M. Hämmerle Holding AG this was to be built on the Rüsch-Werke site. This decision also meant a long-term commitment to the preservation of Dornbirn's industrial architecture heritage and to the nature-conscious public use of this city district.

Completed in 2003, inatura's contemporary building complex was (re-)designed and -constructed using plans by the architecture firm HK Architekten. Three main additions were made to the existing buildings: a technical room, storage rooms, and offices in the old turnery workshops; the showrooms between the turnery and the foundry; and offices and exhibition space in the new foundry.

== Museum concept and focus ==
Aside from its general approach towards scientific knowledge, discoveries and procedures, the inatura's exhibition concept places special emphasis on the scientific world and typical mountain, forest and water habitats of Vorarlberg. Its permanent exhibition "The Miracle of Man" explores and explains the anatomy and physiology of the human body. Special features of the inatura include interactive zones for explaining technical and physical phenomena. There is also a museum store, a restaurant with a guest garden, a natural sciences library and the museum's educational department.

== Additional activities ==
The museum is also issues various publications on nature, natural science activities and the environment in Vorarlberg, including the series "Vorarlberger Naturschau, forschen und entdecken" ("Vorarlberger Naturschau, Research and Discovery"), which deals primarily with current research results relevant to Vorarlberg. It also publishes "Red Lists" of endangered species, compiled on behalf of the Vorarlberg state government.

== Awards ==
In 2005, inatura received the Promotional Award of the Austrian Museum Prize. In 2006, it was honored with a "special recommendation" at the 29th "Museum of the Year Award" in Lisbon, which is the second highest award category of the European Museum Prize.
