= Rolls-Royce Museum =

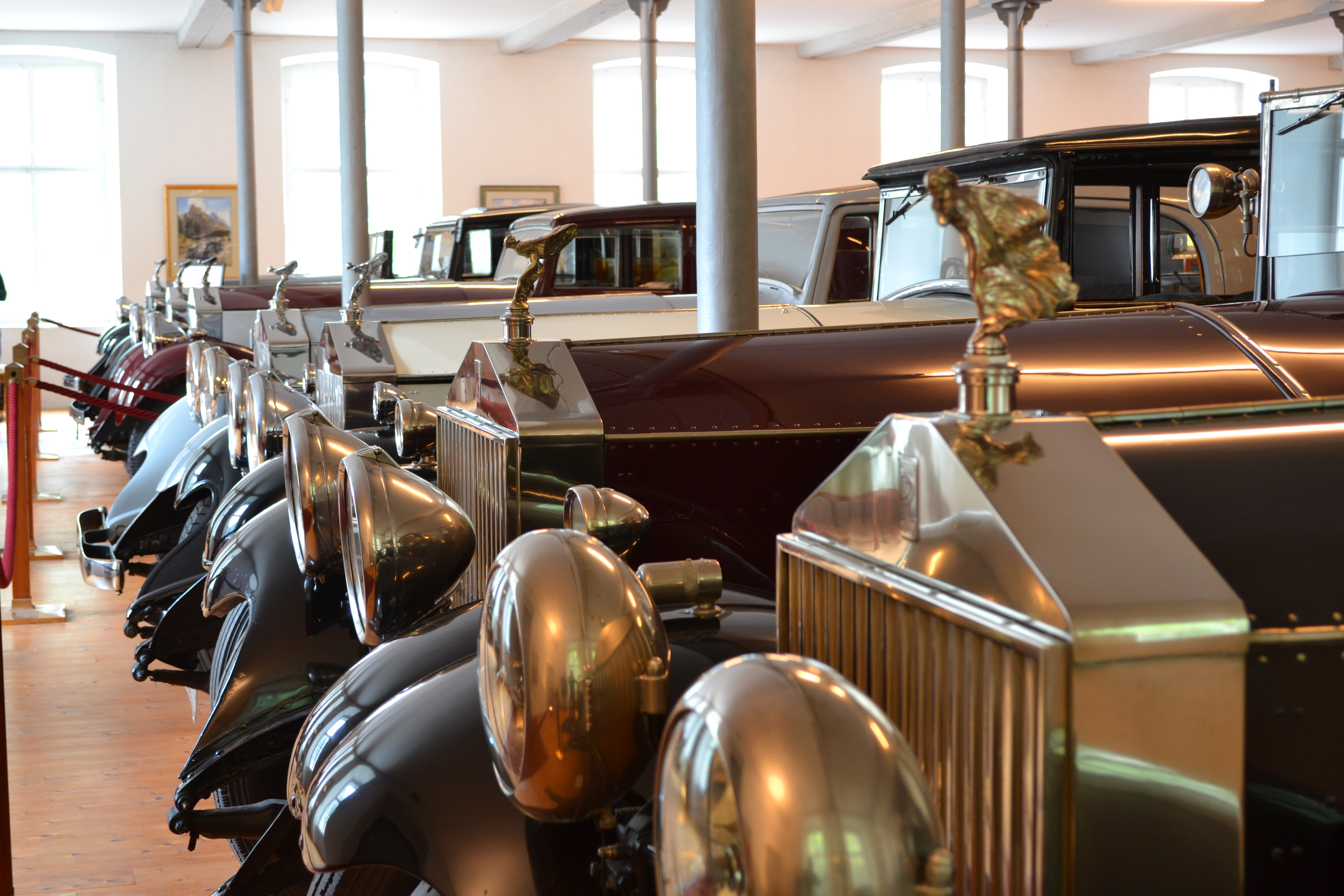

- Location within Austria
- Established: 1999; 27 years ago
- Location: Gütle 11a; 6850 Dornbirn; Austria
- Coordinates: 47°23′26″N 09°46′37″E
- Type: Automobile museum
- Collection size: 70 cars, over 1000 items
- Director: Johannes Vonier
- Website: Rolls-Royce Museum

The Rolls-Royce Museum is a privately owned automobile museum in Dornbirn, Vorarlberg, Austria. Established in 1982, and officially opened to the public in 1999, it has been said to have the world's largest collection of Rolls-Royce cars.

The museum was originally housed in a former textile factory owned by F. M. Hämmerle. In 2017, the museum's founder, Franz Vonier, died, and the local city and state decided to cease subsidising the museum's rent payments. The founder's successors, Bernhard and Johannes Vonier, therefore moved the museum to a smaller building nearby that they owned themselves.

With less space available in the smaller building, the museum now focuses on its more special exhibits, and plans to present a new theme each year. The museum's permanent collection is made up of over 1,000 objects, including around 70 cars.

Highlights from the permanent exhibition include:

- 1927 Phantom I, driven by Peter O’Toole in Lawrence of Arabia
- 1927 Phantom I, owned by General Franco
- 1932 Phantom II, driven by Rita Hayworth
- 1936 Phantom III, owned by Queen Elizabeth

== See also ==
- List of automobile museums
