= FLATZ Museum =

FLATZ Museum - Centre of Photography
- Established: 2009
- Location: Dornbirn, Vorarlberg, Austria
- Coordinates: 47.4117°N 9.7426°E
- Type: Contemporary art
- Website: https://www.flatzmuseum.at/aktuell/

The FLATZ Museum - Centre of Potography is a contemporary art museum in Dornbirn, Vorarlberg (Austria).

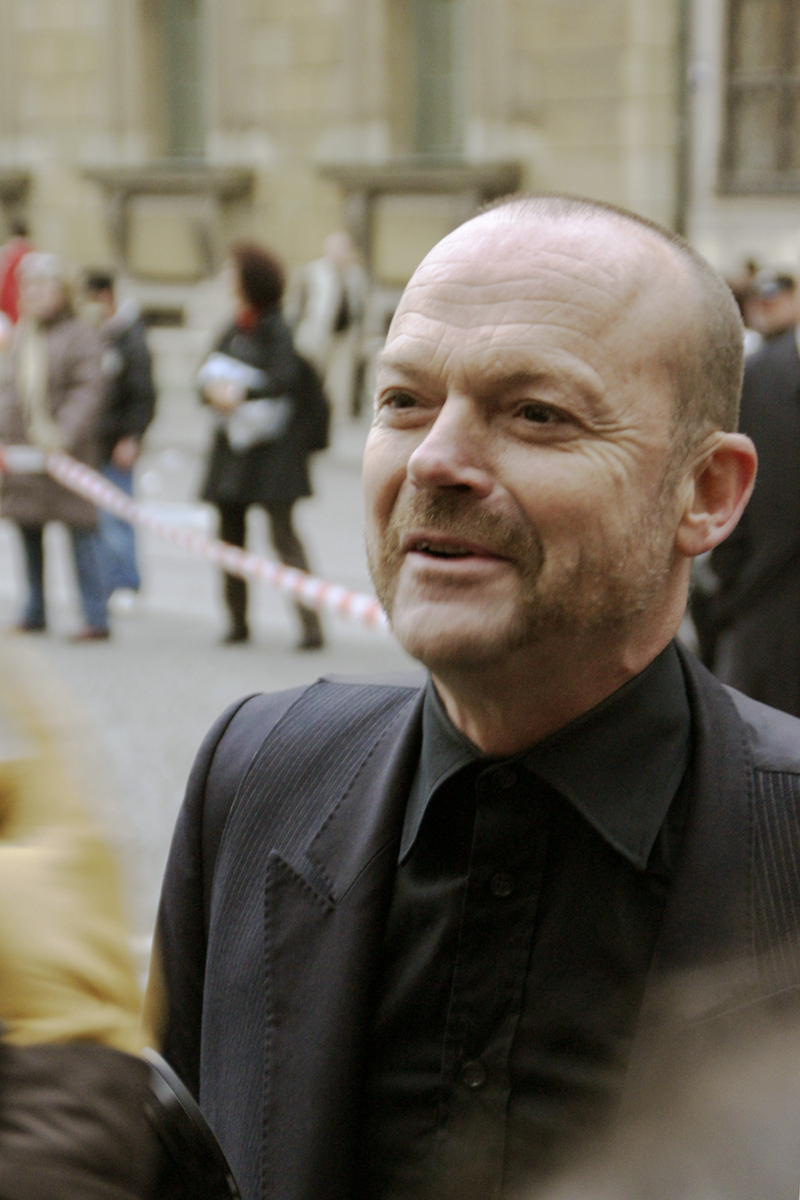
Wolfgang Flatz

The museum dates back to an oeuvre donation to the city of Dornbirn by Wolfgang FLATZ, also known as FLATZ, an action artist. The opening took place in 2009 by the former "documenta" director Jan Hoet.

It shows changing exhibitions designed by international guest curators with a focus on photographic art, organises readings, lecture series, discussions and performances. The collection includes key works by Wolfgang Flatz from the period 1975 to 1999 and is supplemented by private loans.

== Former special exhibitions ==
- 2016: "Shining", Eduard Stranadko – photographs of Chernobyl
- 2017: Elfie Semotan: "Stillleben", Martin Parr: "Cakes Balls"
- 2018: Gisèle Freund: "Frida Kahlo & Diego Rivera"
- 2018: „Die Kamera ist grausam" – masterpieces by Model, Arbus, Goldin
- 2019: FLATZ "FACES"
- 2019: Spencer Tunick: "Nudes"
- 2020: Helmut Newton and Ralph Gibson: "Friends"
- 2021: Hanna Putz "Everything else is a lie"
- 2021: Anna & Maria Ritsch "TOGETHER APART"
- 2021: "Lady Polaroid", including Marsha Burns, Ellen Carey, Helen Chadwick, Sandi Fellman, Barbara Kasten, Sally Mann, Bea Nettles, Barbara Norfleet, Vicki Lee Ragan, Linda Robbennolt, Linda Troeller, Ann Lovett, and Melanie Walker
- 2022: F.C. Gundlach "Mensch und Form"
- 2022: Irving Penn "Black and White"
- 2022: FLATZ "Künstler Jäger 1977 - 1981"
- 2023: Andrej Tarkowski "The Mirror of Memories"
- 2023: Ute mahler, Sibylle Bergemann, Evelyn Richter & Gundula Schulze Eldowy "Café Sibylle | Mode und Alltag in der DDR"
- 2024: Rafaela Pröll "Love and Date"
- 2024: Marina Abramović, Gina Pane, Günter Brus, VALIE EXPORT und Jürgen Klauke "No limits | Körper, Performance und Photographie"
- 2024: FLATZ "Schuldig - Nicht Schuldig"
- 2024: Christian Anwander "American Stories"
- 2025: Inge Morath "Ich traue meinen Augen"
