= Mohren Biererlebniswelt =

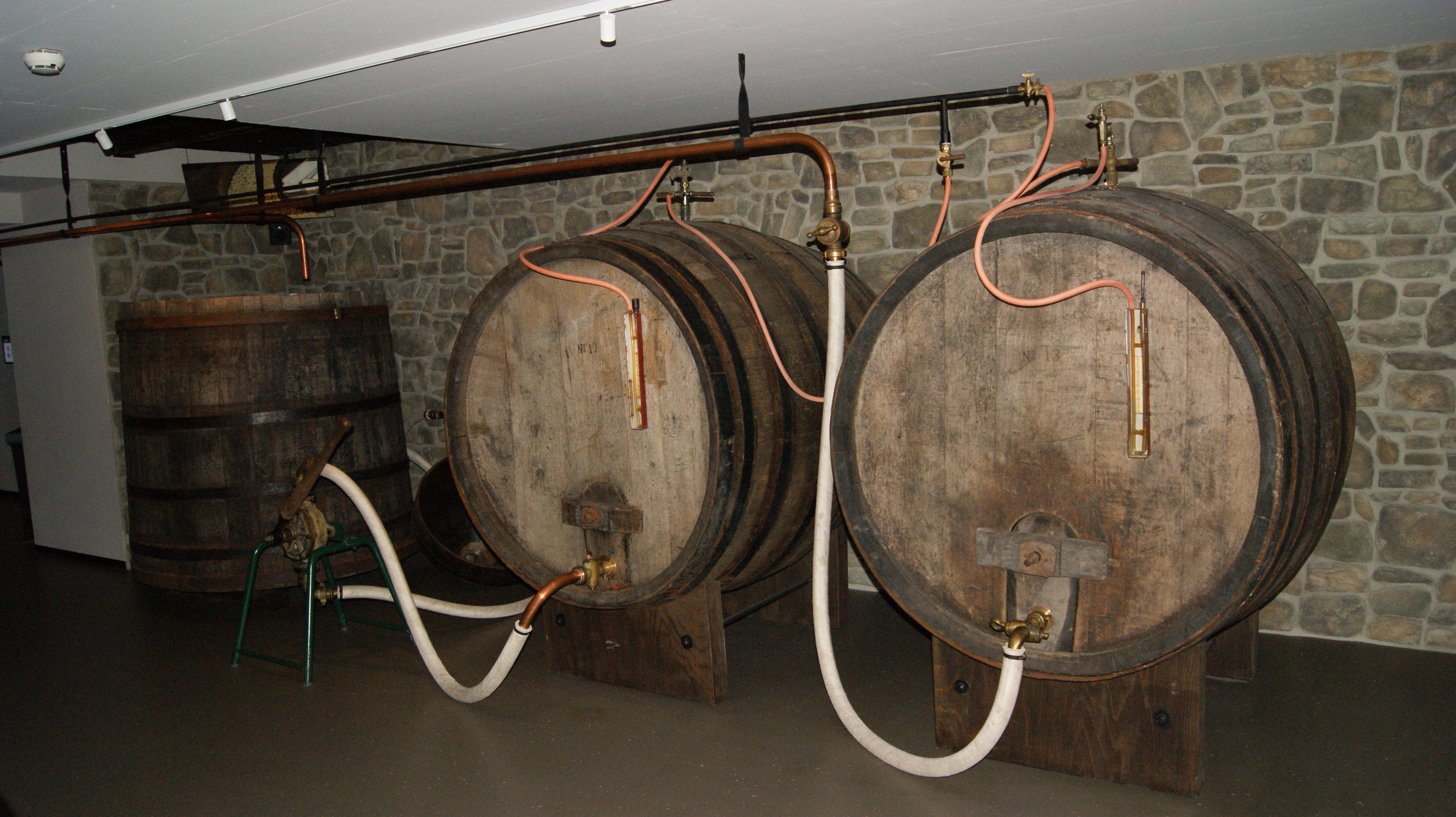
- Established: 2016
- Location: Dornbirn, Vorarlberg, Austria
- Type: Beer museum
- Collection size: About 10,000 (2016)
- Director: Caroline Festini
- Employees: 115 (2016)
- Website: https://www.mohrenbrauerei.at/de/erlebniswelt-mohren/mohrenbiererlebniswelt

The Mohren Biererlebniswelt is a museum about the history of the Mohren brewery, the art of brewing and regional brewing customs and is located at the headquarters of the Mohren brewery in Dornbirn, Vorarlberg (Austria). It was opened on 22 October 2016.

There are about 10,000 exhibits on display, from small as beer coasters to a replica of the facade of the former inn "Mohren" from the 19th century. Another attraction is the plant from the former Satteinser Schäfle brewery which was shut down in 1917 and was purchased by Heinz Huber in 1989.

== History ==
The museum's name Mohren Biererlebniswelt is linked to the brewery of the same name: Mohrenbrauerei. The name derives from Josef Mohr, who operated a tavern in Dornbirn in 1784 with an attached brewery which he called "Zum Mohren". On May 1, 1834, Franz-Anton Huber took over the tavern along with the brewery and kept the name.

== The building ==
The museum was built from early 2015 to late 2016 by the architecture office hämmerle.tschikof GmbH. The exhibition space stretches over 700 square meters on four floors.

Photo gallery

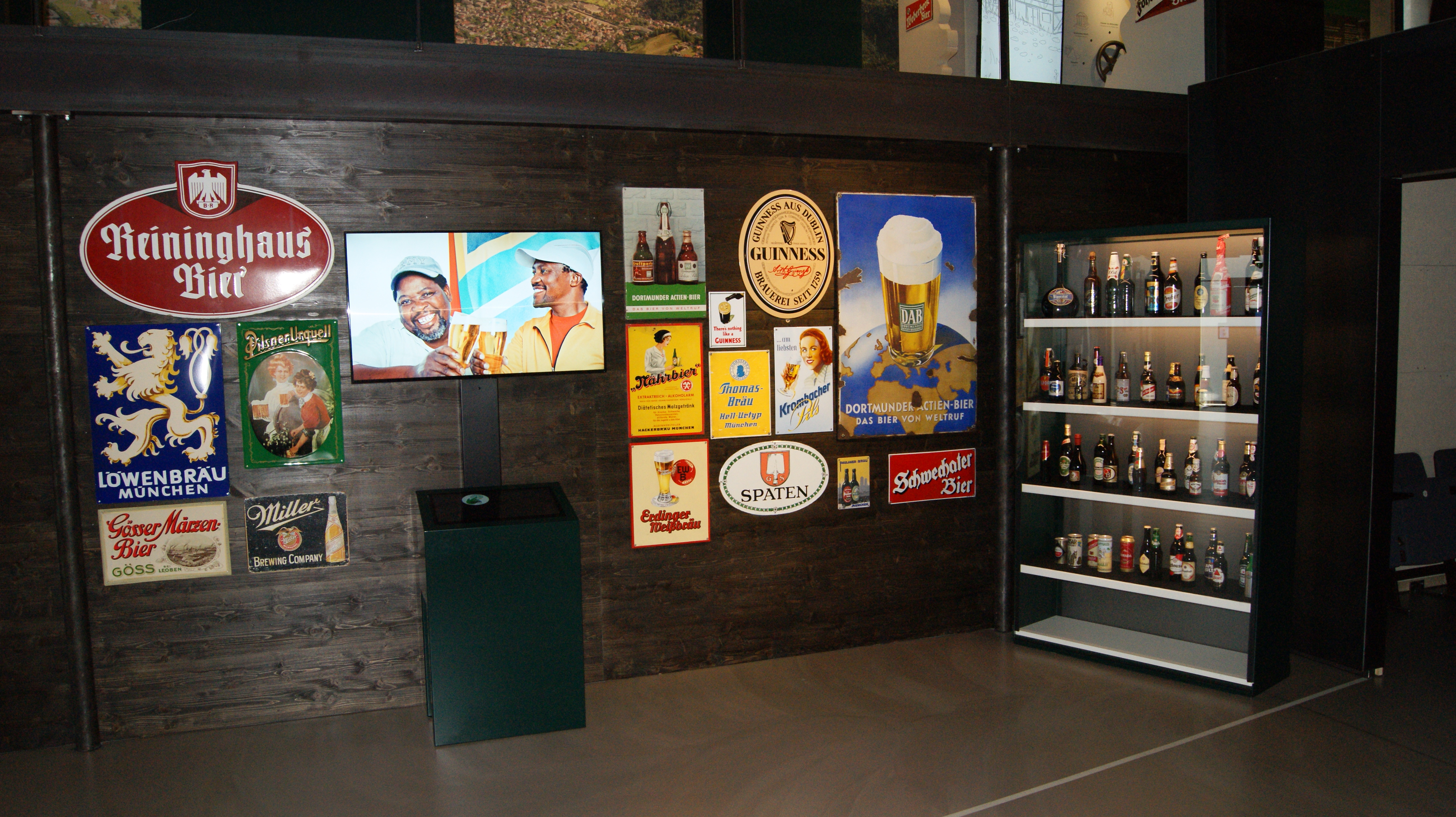

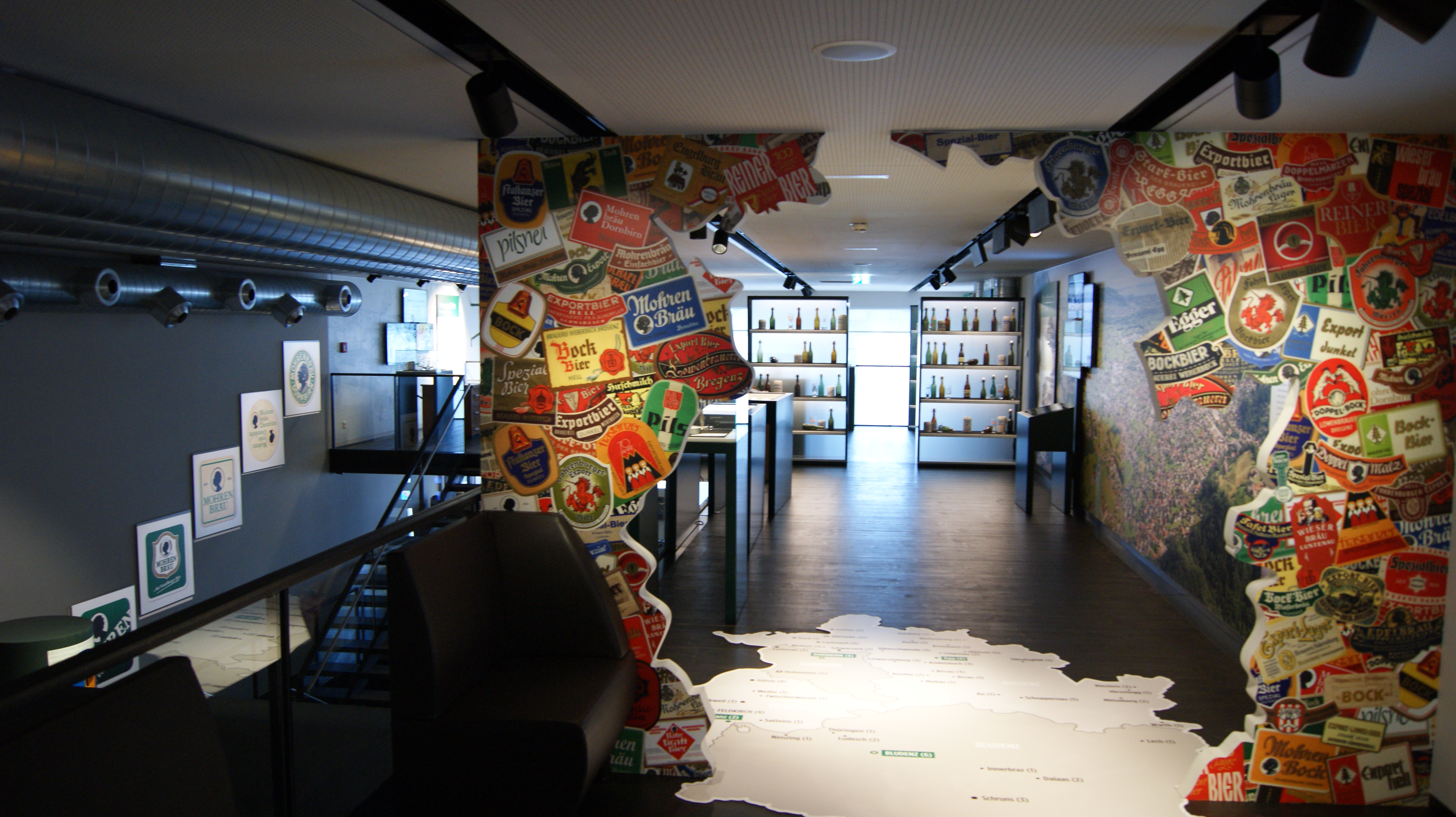

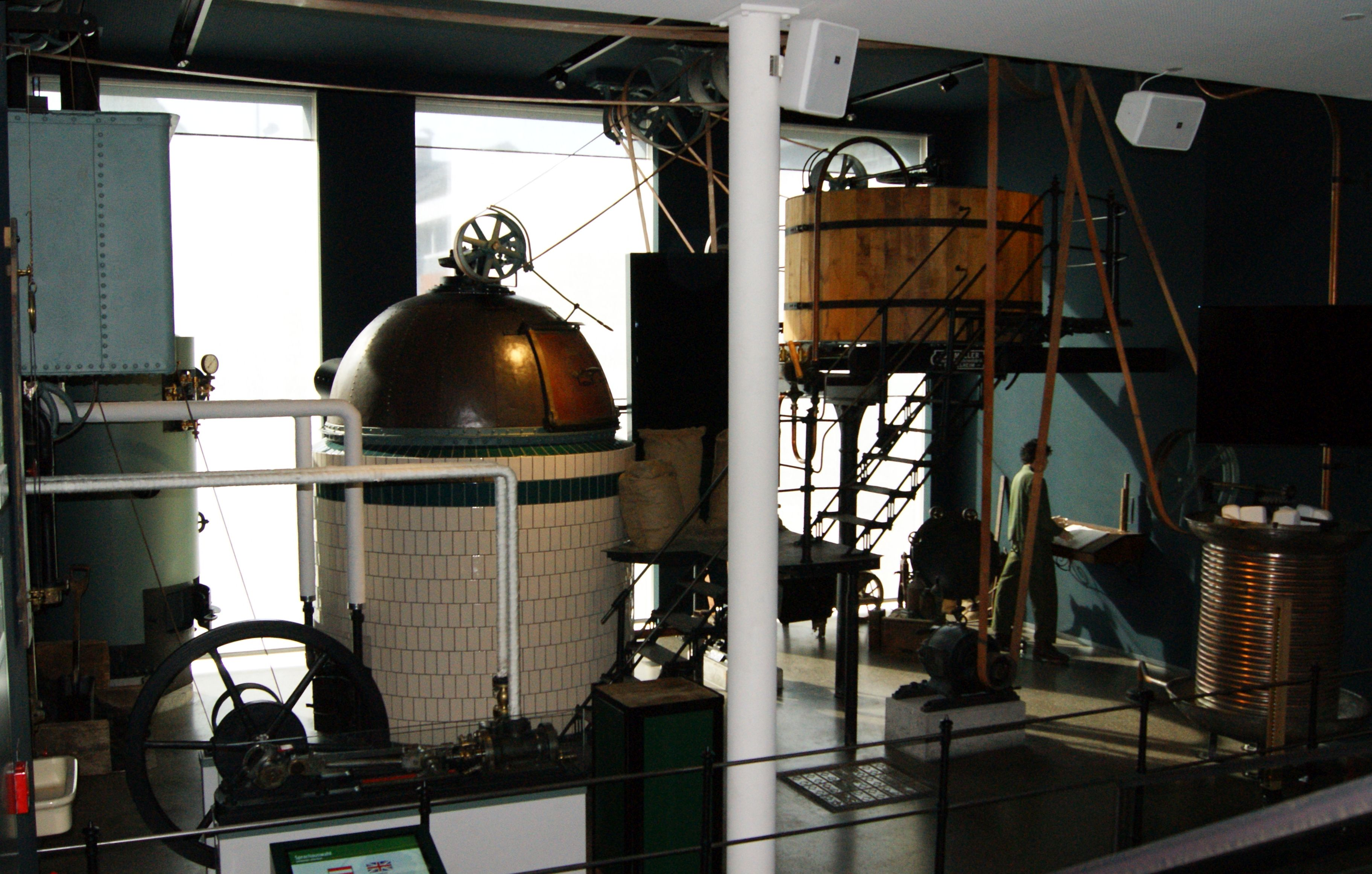

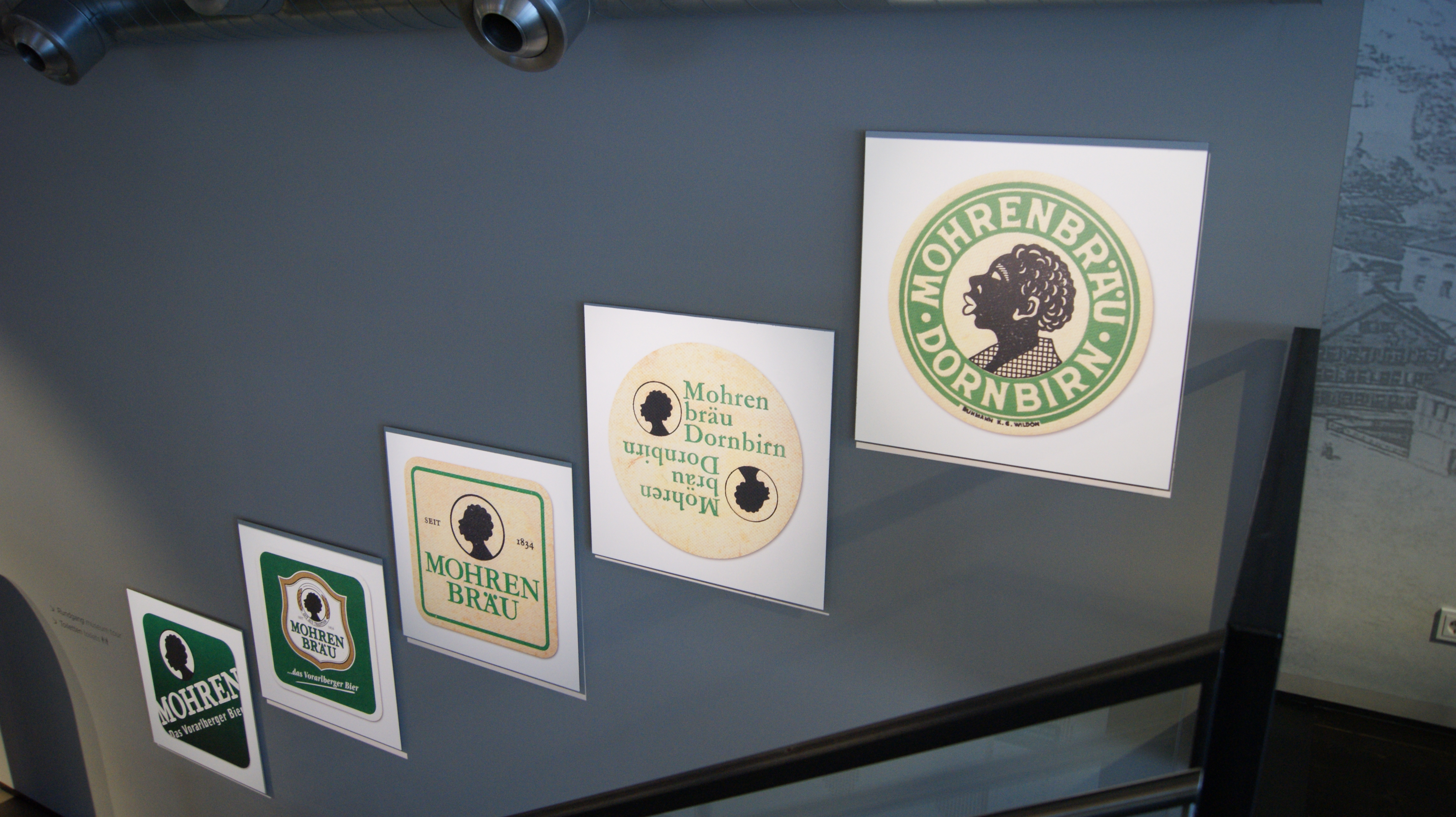

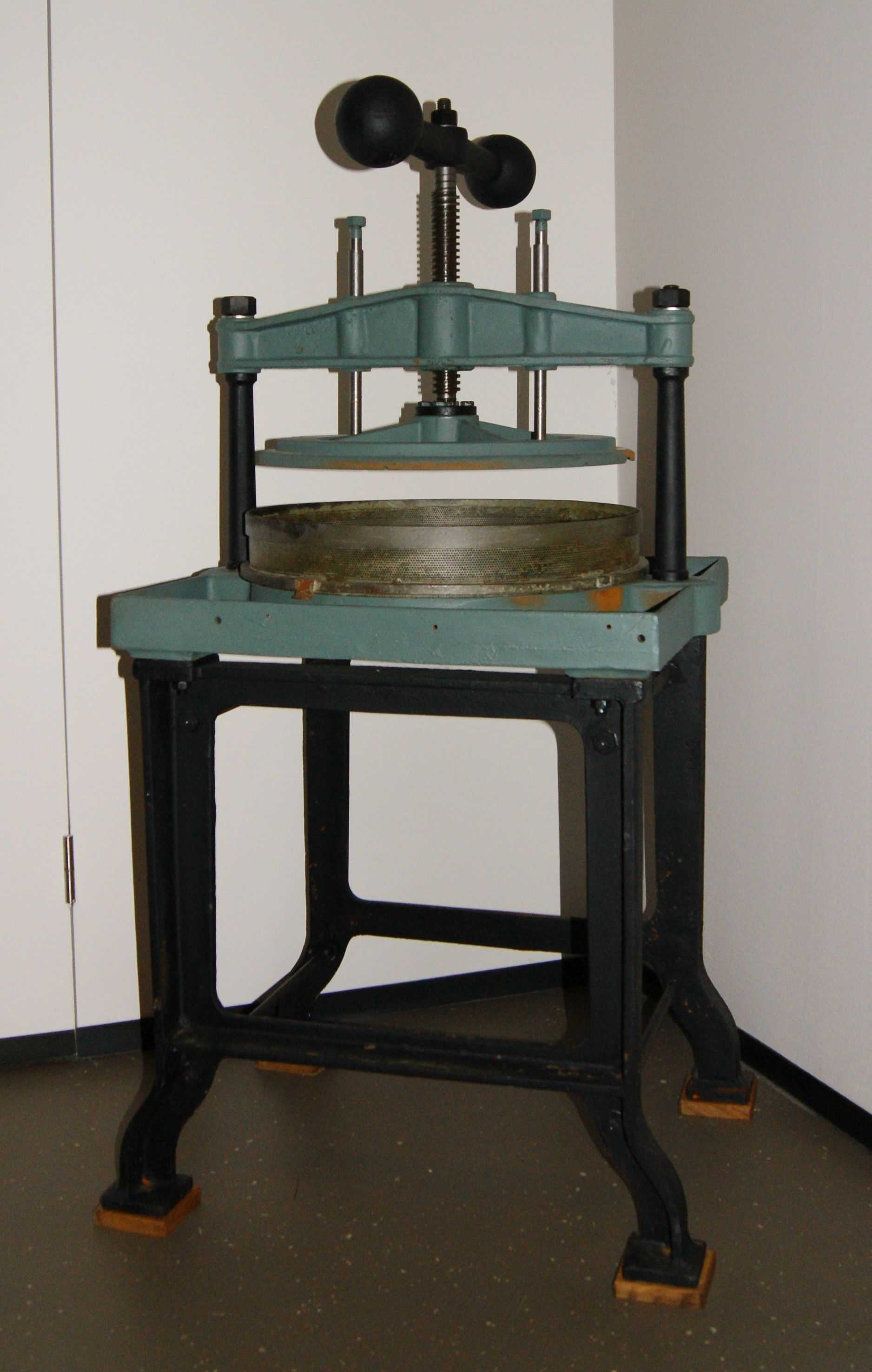

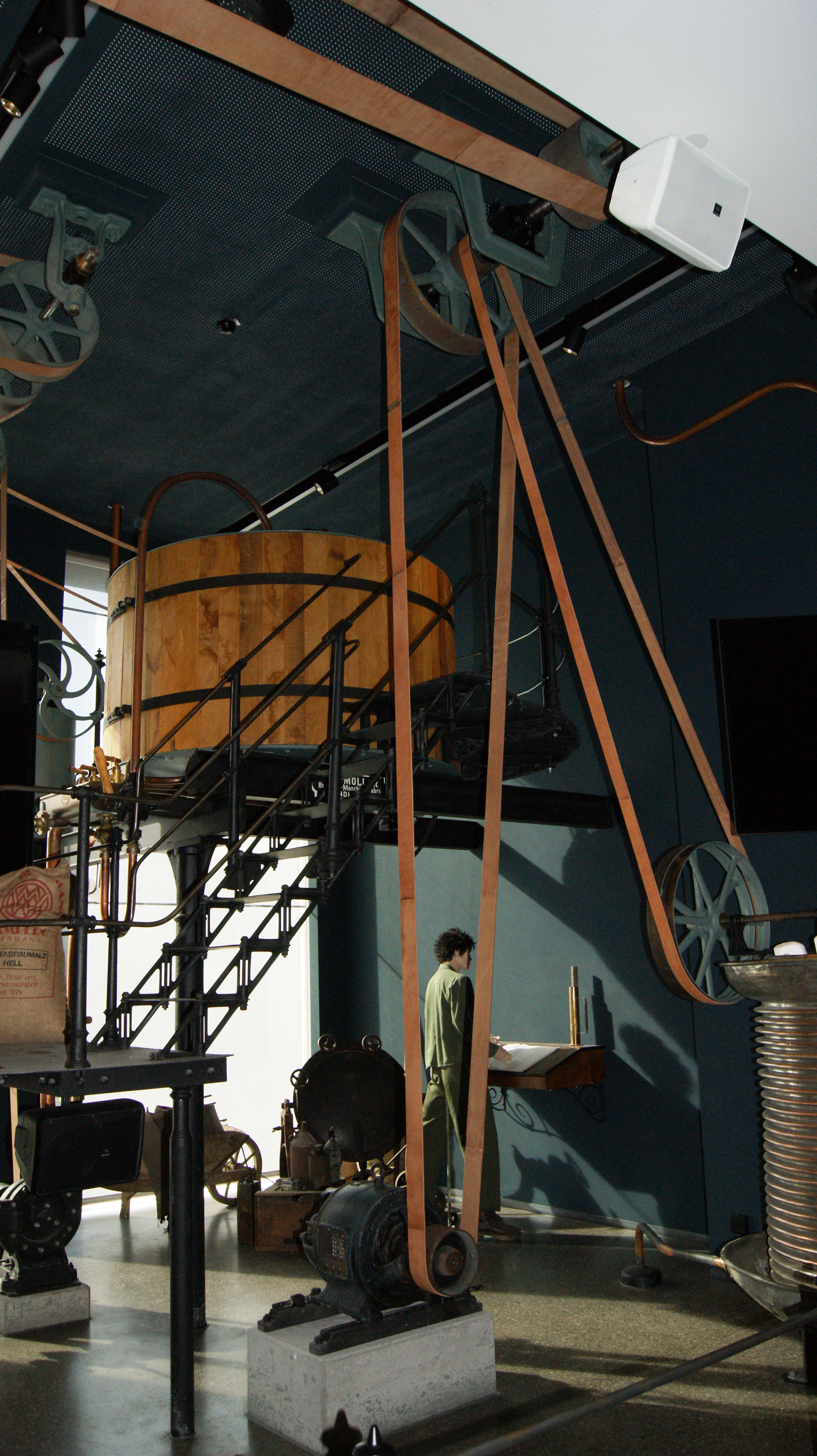

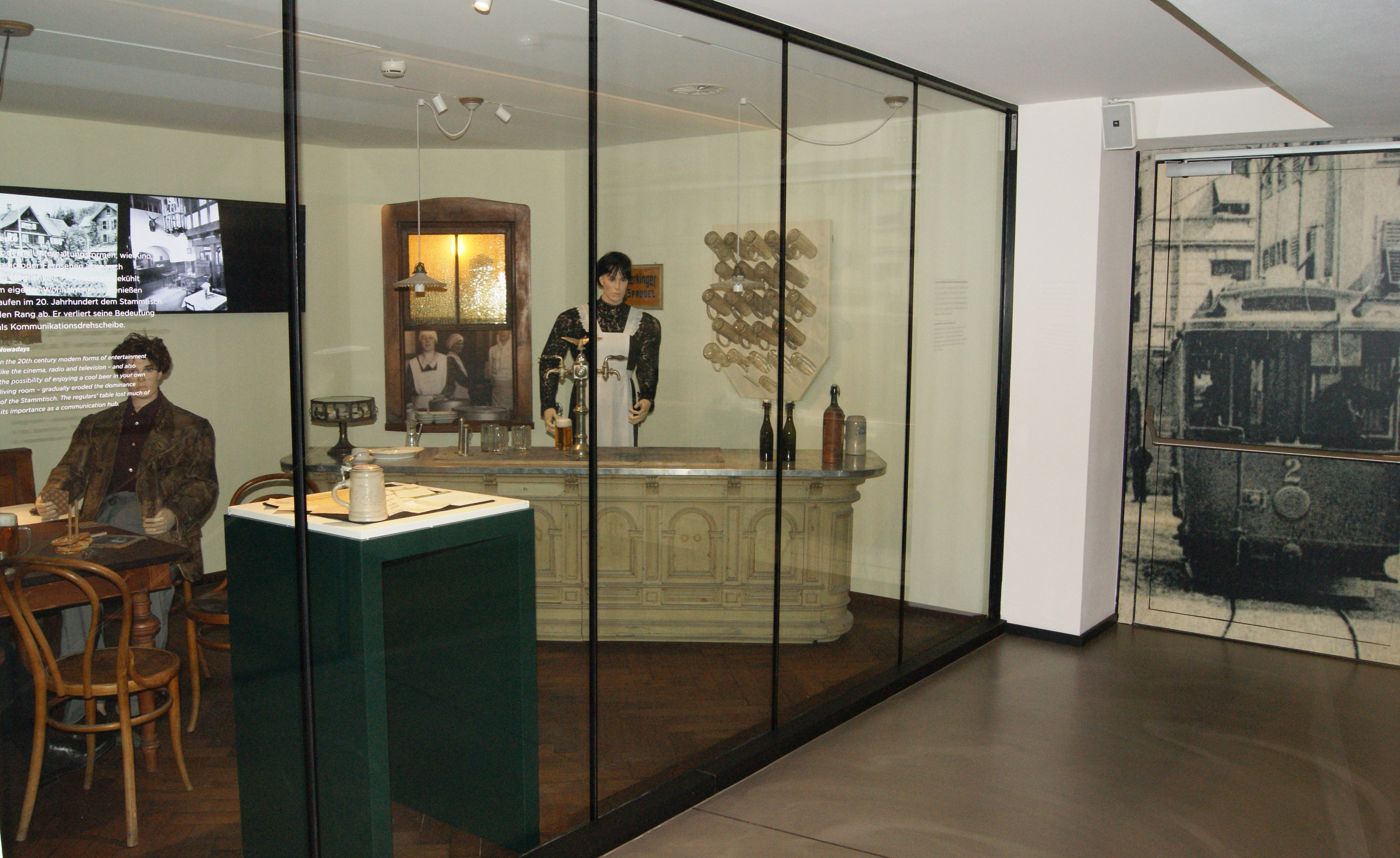
