= Egg, Austria =

Egg
- Municipality
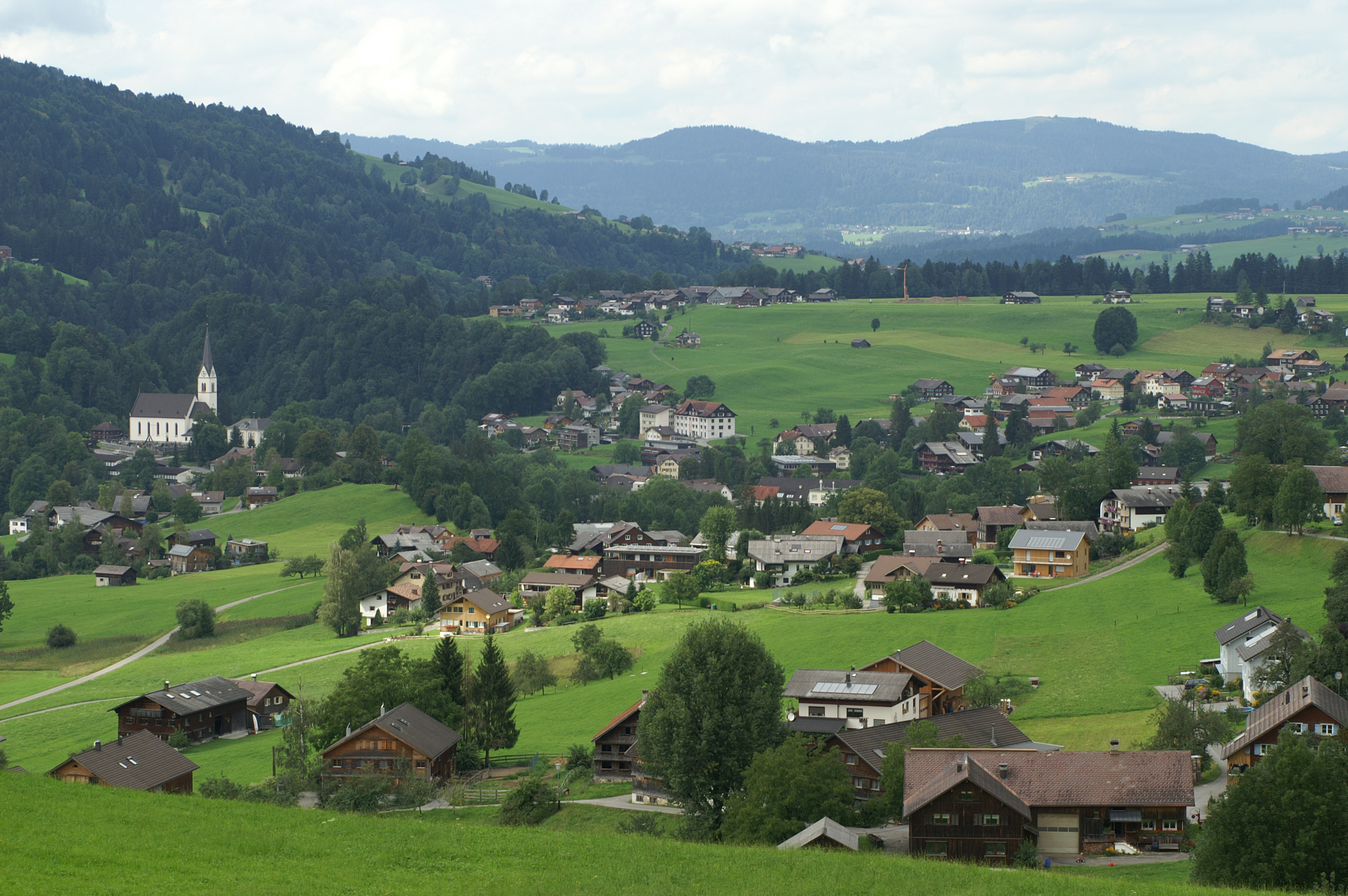

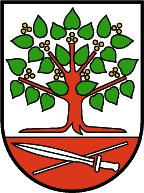
- Coat of arms

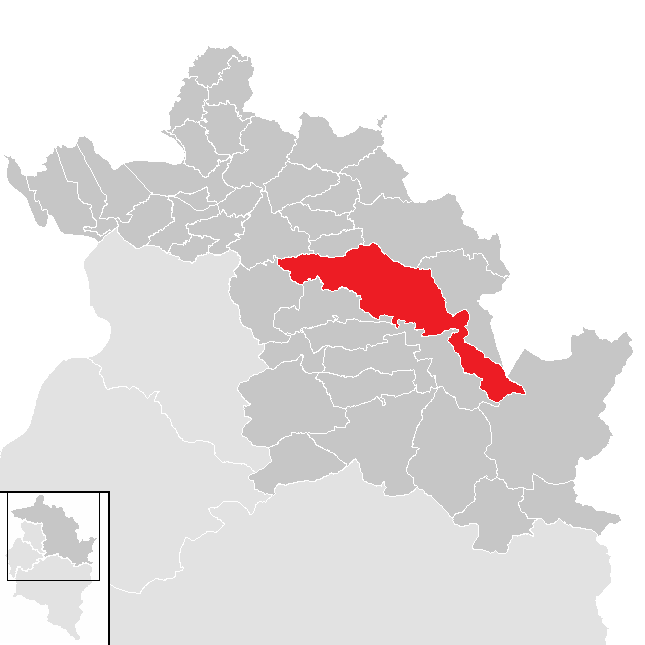
- Location in the district

- Location within Austria
- Coordinates: 47°25′55″N 09°53′44″E
- Country: Austria
- State: Vorarlberg
- District: Bregenz

Government
  - Mayor: Dr. Paul Sutterlüty (Egger und Großdorfer Liste)

Area
  - Total: 65.37 km^{2} (25.24 sq mi)
- Elevation: 561 m (1,841 ft)

Population (2018-01-01)
  - Total: 3,547
  - Density: 54.26/km^{2} (140.5/sq mi)
- Time zone: UTC+1 (CET)
  - Summer (DST): UTC+2 (CEST)
- Postal code: 6863
- Area code: 05512
- Vehicle registration: B
- Website: www.egg.at

Egg is a market town in the Bregenz Forest, in the western Austrian state of Vorarlberg, part of the district of Bregenz. It has the highest population of any community in the Bregenzerwald.

In 1894, the Brauerei Egg, the only brewery left in the Bregenzerwald, was established there.

== Population ==
Historical population
Year	Pop.	±%
1869	1,617	—
1880	1,642	+1.5%
1890	1,652	+0.6%
1900	1,920	+16.2%
1910	1,902	−0.9%
1923	1,958	+2.9%
1934	2,051	+4.7%
1939	1,994	−2.8%
1951	2,359	+18.3%
1961	2,458	+4.2%
1971	2,682	+9.1%
1981	2,857	+6.5%
1991	3,169	+10.9%
2001	3,361	+6.1%
2011	3,370	+0.3%

== Geography ==
Egg has an area of 65.37 km^{2} (25.2 mi^{2}). The river Bregenzerach and the Schmittenbach stream flow through the village, while the Subersach flows just north of the village into the Bregenzer Ach.

== Culture ==
The Parish Church Hl. Nikolaus, first mentioned in 1275, is one of the oldest church buildings in the Bregenz Forest.

The Parish Church Hl. Josef (Egg-Großdorf) was designed by Kaspar Waldner in 1760-1762 and consecrated in 1770.

The Egg Museum is, founded in 1904, is specialized in regional culture.

The wooden Gschwendtobel Bridge between Lingenau and Egg, over the river Subersach, was constructed in 1834 by Alois Negrelli (also involved in the planning of the Suez Canal). Given its age, the bridge is considered to be a masterpiece of engineering and carpentry.

The suspension bridge between Lingenau and Egg (over the river Subersach), a wire footbridge with a length of 57 m (187 ft), was constructed in 1901.

The Bregenzerwald Umgang (literally "Bregenzerwald Walking Tour") offers insights into the architecture and community planning of 12 traditional villages in the Bregenzerwald. While walking over various landscapes, visiting public buildings, homes and everyday objects, walkers gain a comprehensive overview of typical Bregenzerwald architectural styles as they developed throughout the ages.

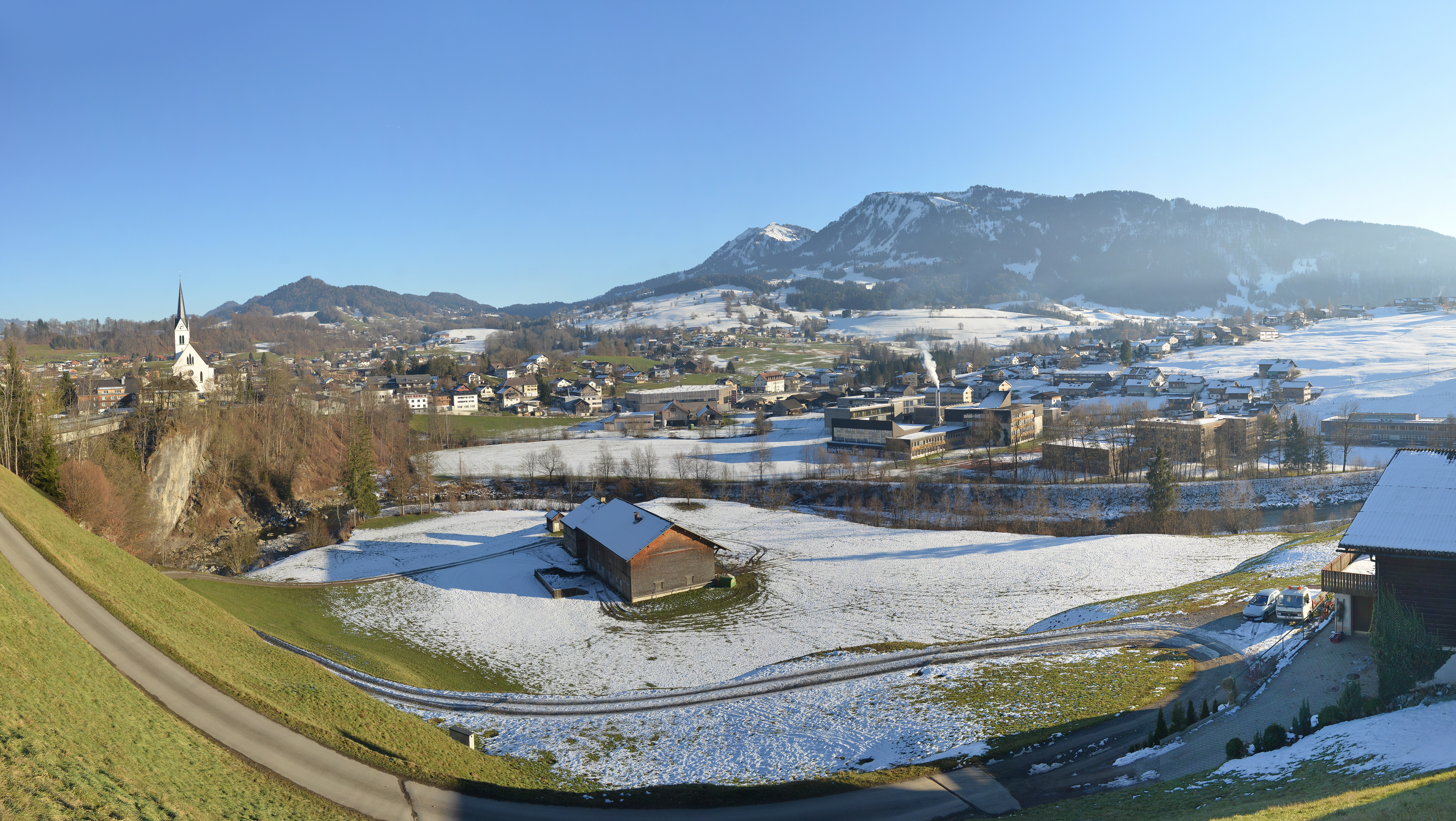
Panoramic view of Egg
