= KäseStrasse Bregenzerwald =

Bregenz Forest Cheese Route
- KäseStrasse Bregenzerwald
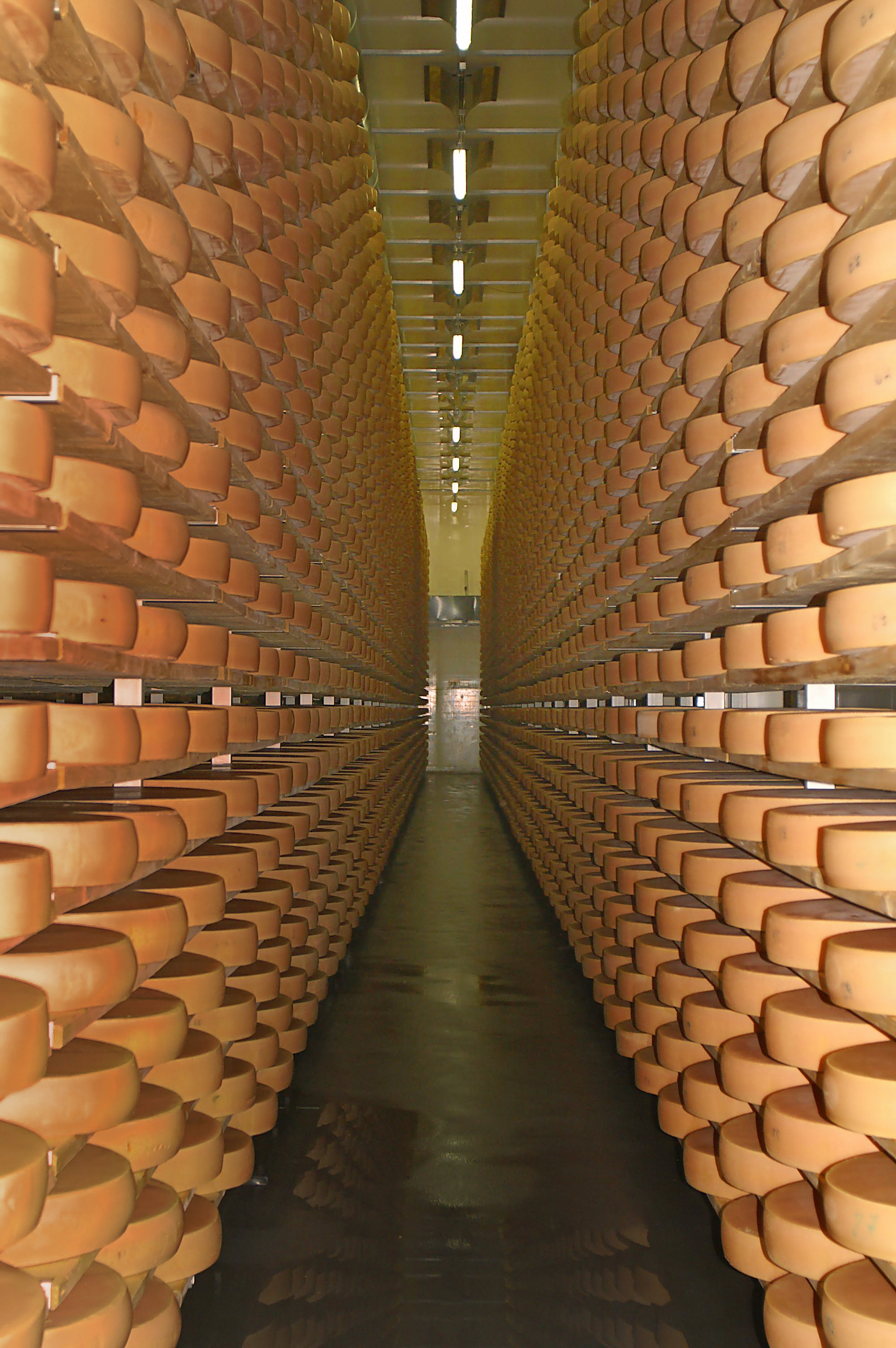
- Cheese cellar in Lingenau along the cheese route in the Bregenz Forest
- Formation: 1998
- Founded at: Bregenz Forest, Vorarlberg
- Type: Nonprofit
- Purpose: Supporting the traditional local agricultural landscape of the Bregenz Forest
- Location: Austria
- Services: Culinary tastings, outdoor activities related to the cultural and natural landscape of the Bregenz Forest
- Leader: Max Bereuter (2021)
- Website: https://www.kaesestrasse.at/en/

The KäseStrasse Bregenzerwald ("Cheese Route of the Bregenz Forest") is a non-profit organisation and route which links cheese-producing businesses of the Bregenz Forest in Vorarlberg (Austria).

It was founded in 1998 with the aim of supporting local farmers, craftsmen and tradesmen. All members and partners of the KäseStrasse contribute to preserving the traditional agricultural landscape of the Bregenz Forest.

== History ==
The production of cheese has a long tradition in the Bregenzerwald. The Celts first brought the region into contact with livestock and alpine agriculture. Milk and dairy products, especially the so-called mountain cheeses (Bergkäse) produced on the alpine pastures and village dairies, were vital for the nutrition of the Walser population for centuries. The cheese soon became an important export product, thus further developing its value for the economy.

For producing the dairy-products, the local farmers drove livestock between the valleys in winter, the medium-high pastures in spring and high-pastures in summer. The milk obtained, separated from cow, goat and sheep milk (mainly cow raw milk), is transported down the road by means of a transport cableway or handcart or car, where a milk tank takes up the milk. The tanks are then brought to a cheese factory (today near Hittisau), where cheese production starts.

When Austria joined the European Union in 1995, the Bregenz Forest received funds from EU programs, for example LEADER II (today LEADER+), for the development of the economy in rural areas. Without the Käsestraße Bregenzerwald, economic survival would not have been possible for the majority of small-scale farms in the 1990s.

This so-called alpine transhumance ("Dreistufenwirtschaft" in German) shaped much of the landscape in the Alps and is still practiced today. This type of ranching means that the livestock is moved from one stable to another several times a year. In 2011, alpine transhumance in the Bregenz Forest was declared an intangible cultural heritage by UNESCO. It was recognised that the Bregenz Forest is "an impressive landscape on the north side of the Alps" that has "largely maintained its traditional farming structure." Many of the characteristic Bregenz Forest farmsteads of the 18th and 19th centuries have been conserved. Thus, farms, farmers huts and alpine pastures are still part of the typical scenery in Vorarlberg. Moreover, the life of the locals was heavily influenced by alpine transhumance and its seasonal migration which resulted in the development of traditional Alpine culture, such as Yodel, Alphorn or Schwingen.

== The route ==
The Cheese Route starts in Bregenz and runs along the Bregenzerwaldstraße L 200 and connects villages through the Alps. Along this route, there are many farmers, dairy-producers, shops and cheese-producers.

The area was also integrated with its cheese varieties in 2005 as a region "Bregenzerwälder Alpkäse" (Bregenz Forest alp-cheese) and Bergkäse (mountain-cheese) in the project "Genussregion Österreich", which is an organisation that promotes traditional food and food-products of Austria.

== See also ==
- Vorarlberger Bergkäse
- Vorarlberger Alpkäse
- Sura Kees ("sour cheese")

== Photo gallery ==
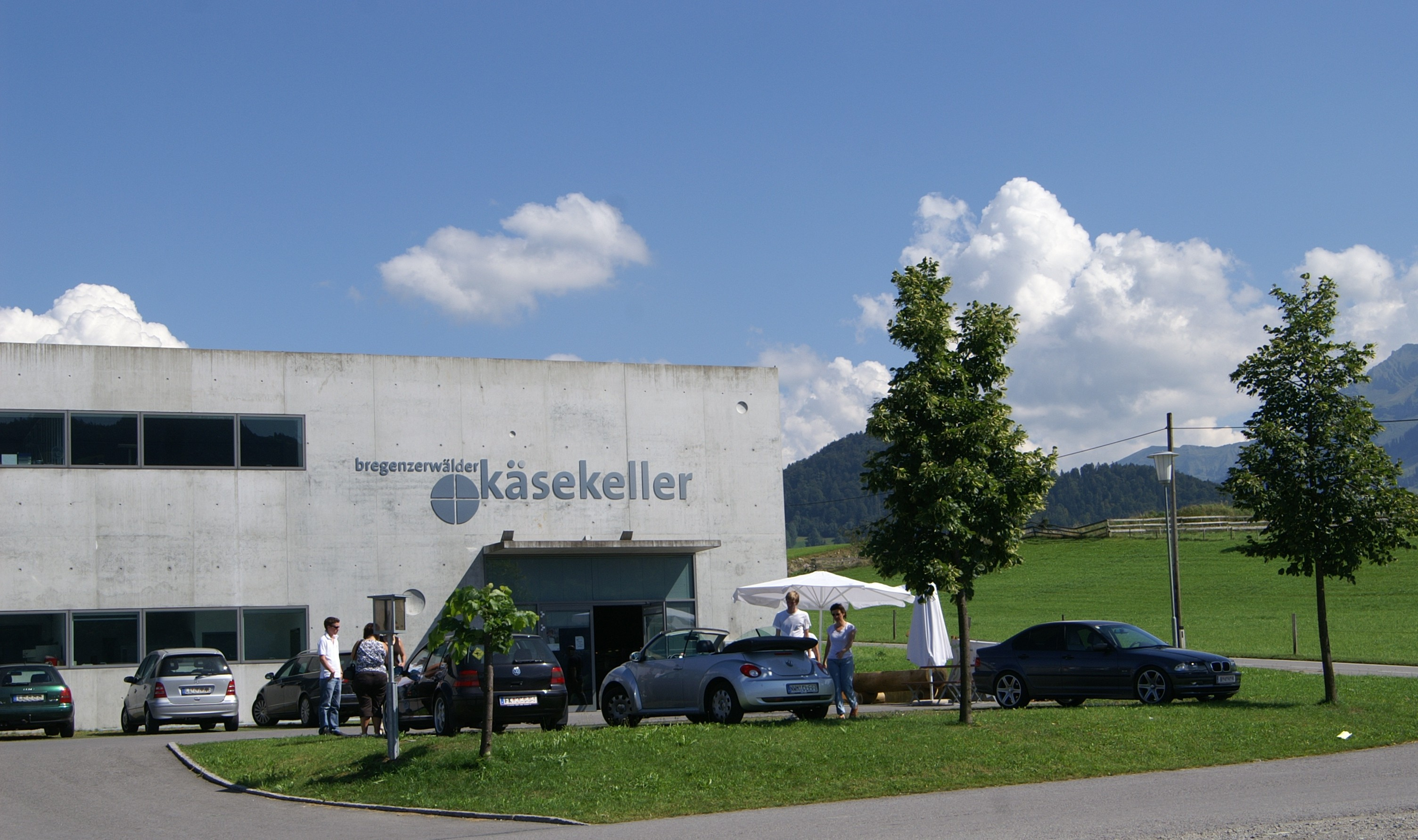
Bregenz Forest cheese cellar (Bregenzerwälder Käsekeller) in Lingenau

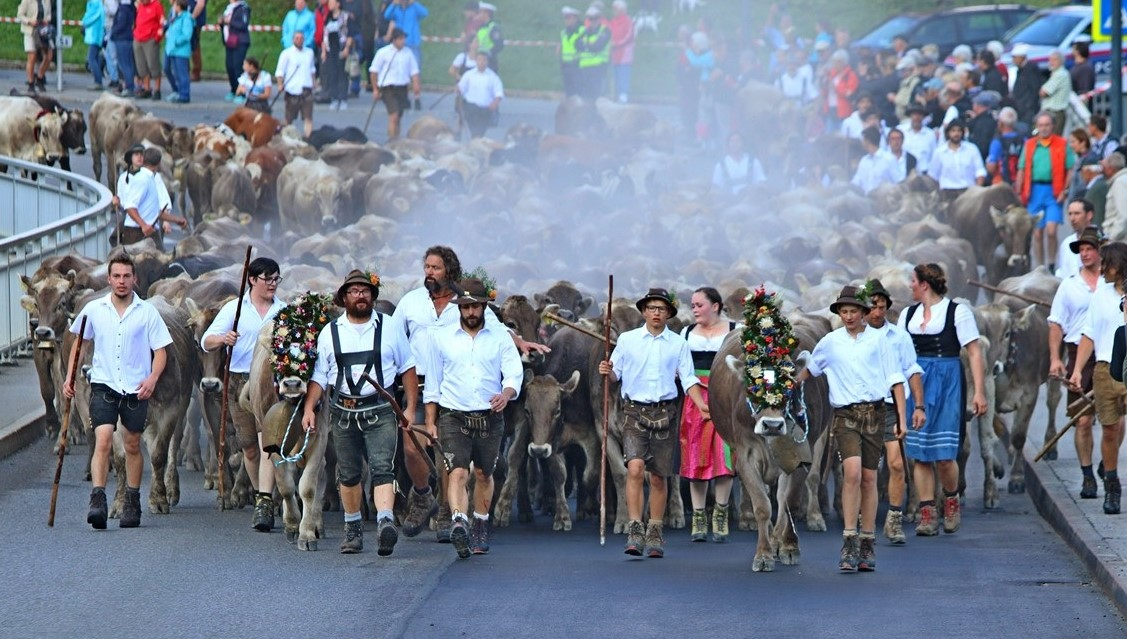
Almabtrieb in the Kleinwalsertal (2018)

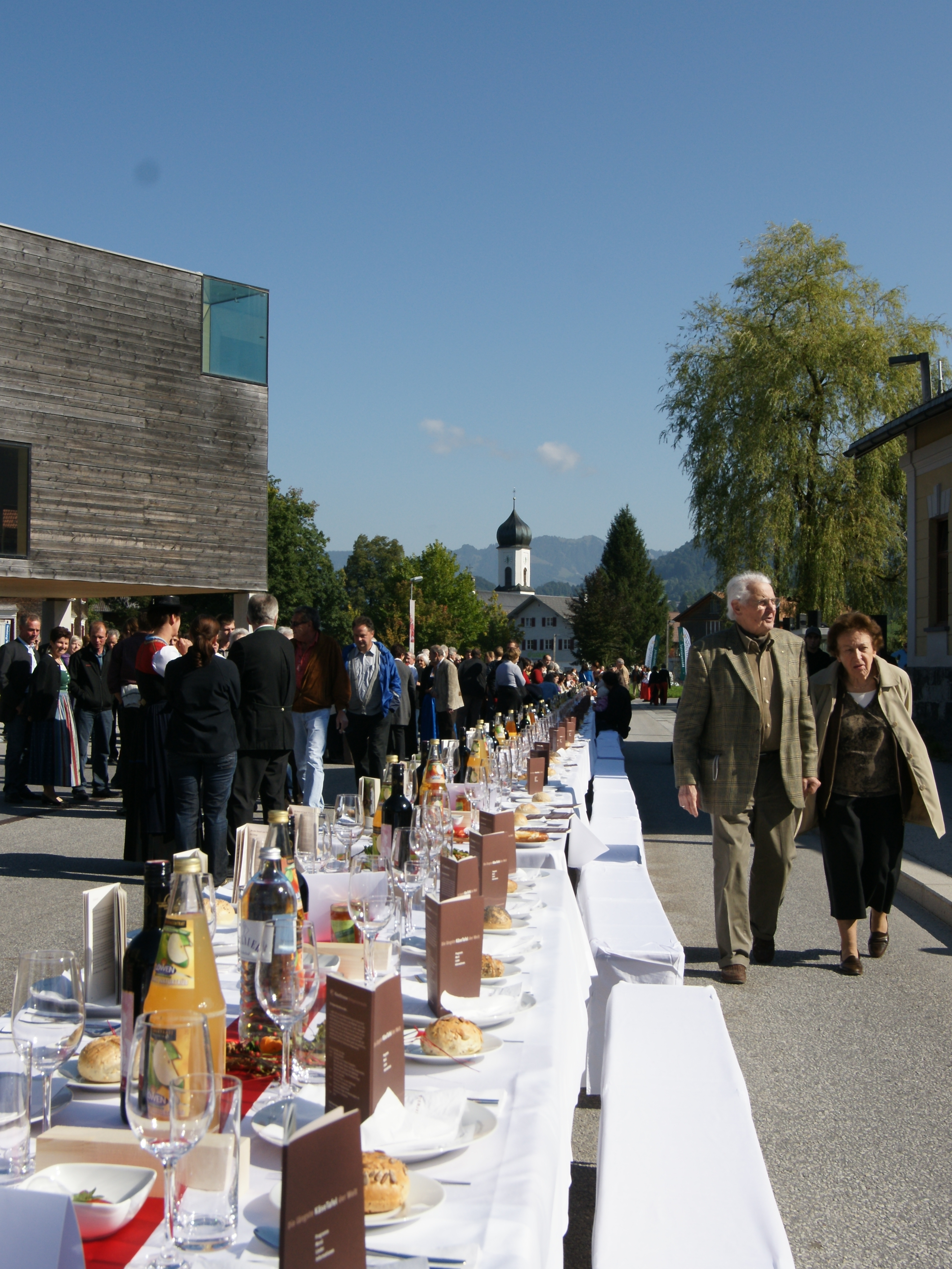
The longest cheese-table in the world (in the Guinness book of the records about 500 m) was covered on May 31, 2008, as celebration for the 10th anniversary of the KäseStrasse Bregenzerwald in Andelsbuch for about 2000 guests.
