= Alpine transhumance =

Seasonal moving of livestock

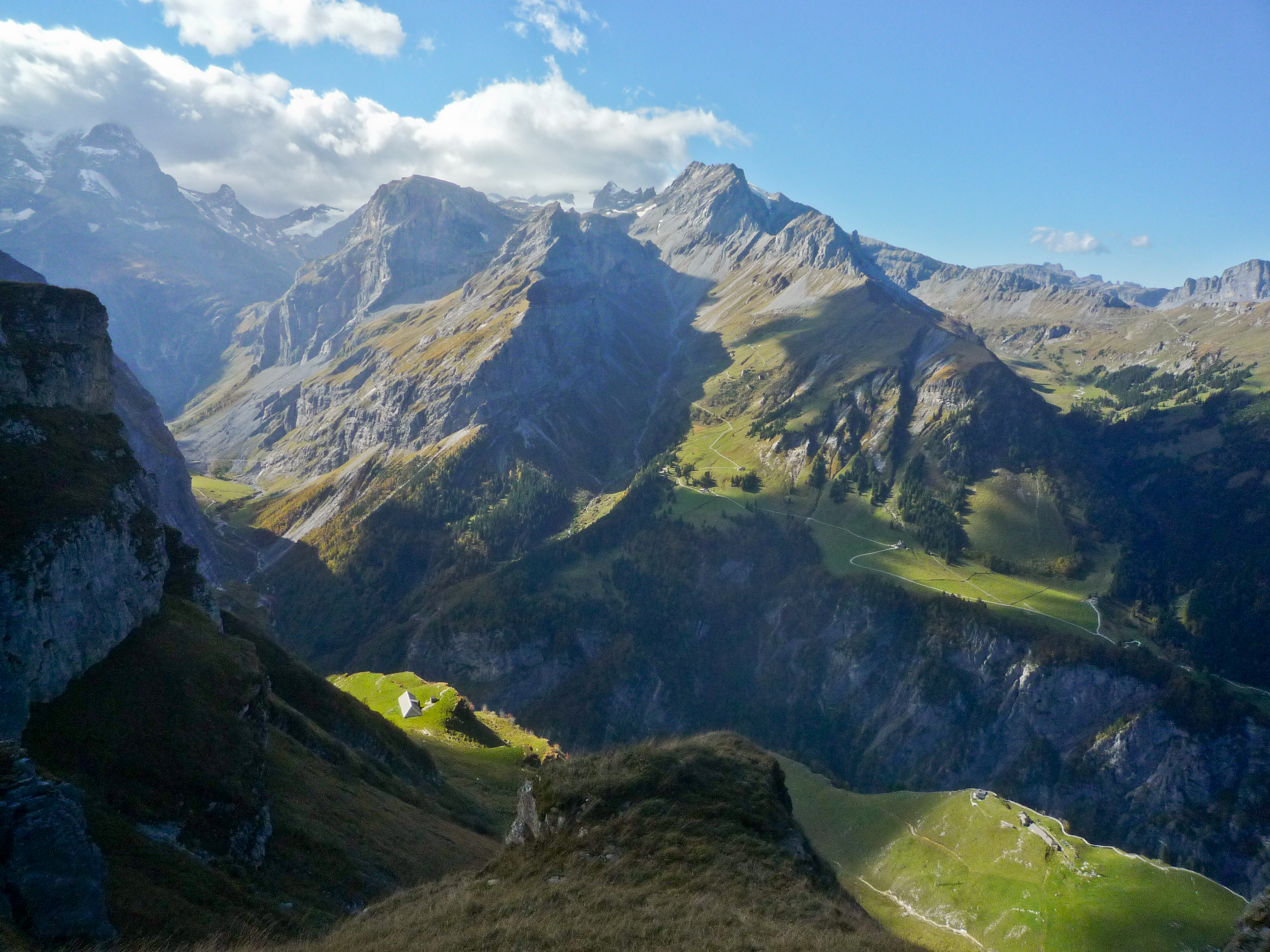
Five alps around Tierfehd, between 1280 (far left) and 1830 (foreground left) meters, highlighted by the afternoon sun.

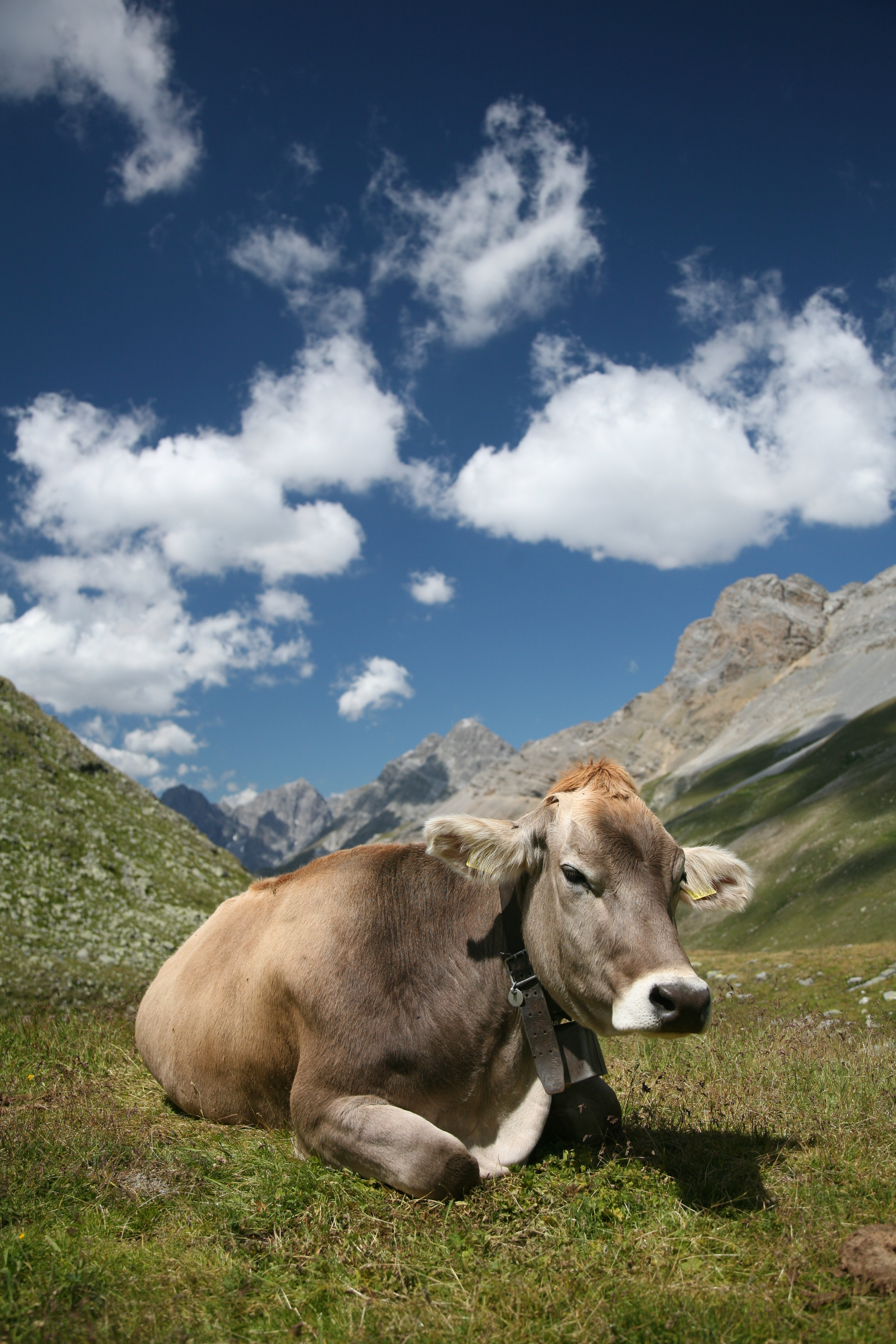
Braunvieh cow on high pasture in the Engadin (2007)

Alpine transhumance is transhumance as practiced in the Alps, that is, a seasonal droving of grazing livestock between the valleys in winter and the high mountain pastures in summer (German Alpwirtschaft, Almwirtschaft from the term for "seasonal mountain pasture", Alp, Alm). Transhumance is a traditional practice that has shaped much of the landscape in the Alps, as without it, most areas below 2,000 m (6,600 ft) would be forests. While tourism and industry contribute today much to Alpine economy, seasonal migration to high pastures is still practiced in Bavaria, Austria, Slovenia, Italy, France and Switzerland, except in their most frequented tourist centers. In some places, cattle are taken care of by local farmer families who move to higher places. In others, this job is for herdsmen who are employees of the cooperative owning the pastures.

Most Alpine pastures are below 2,400 m (7,900 ft); all are below 2,800 m (9,200 ft). The higher regions not suitable for transhumance are known as the High Alps.

== Etymology ==
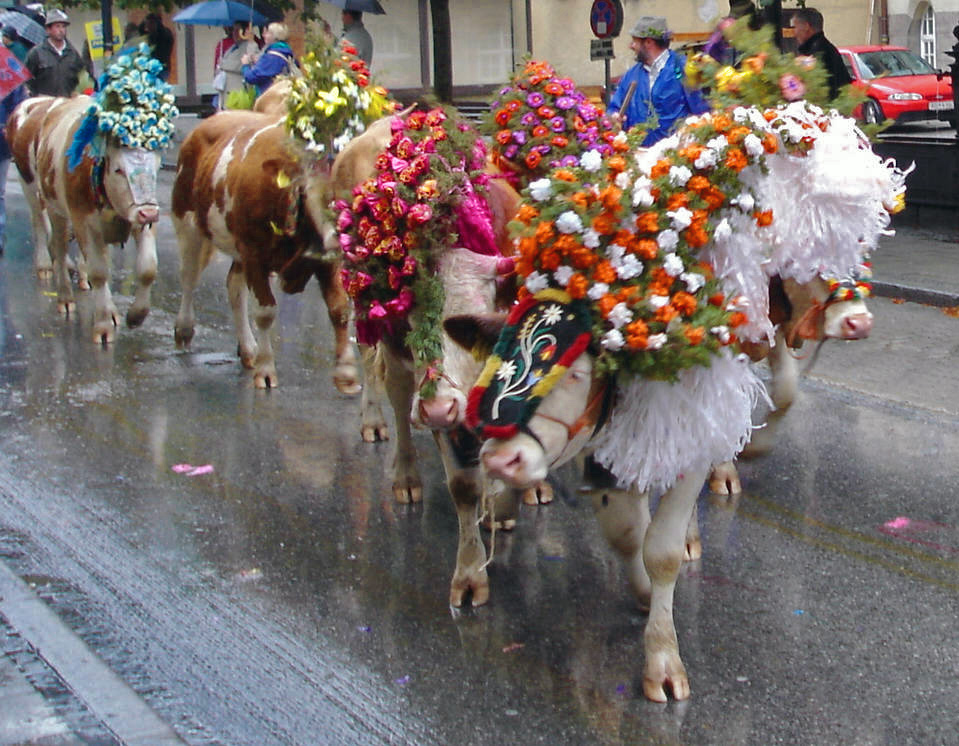
Almabtrieb, Kufstein (2005)

The German word Alp or Alm (meaning "seasonal mountain pasture", from Old High German alpa, alba) is originally identical to the name of the Alps (German Alpen) itself, probably a pre-Roman (and possibly pre-Indo-European) term for "mountain". In French, the corresponding word for "alpine pasture" is alpage.

== History ==
Bringing livestock to summer pasture, Schwägalp (Jun 2004)

Evidence survives of a transhumance economy in the Alps dating to the later Neolithic period (c. 3000 BC), with evidence for pastures above the treeline reported for the Bronze Age (17th to 11th centuries BCE) in the Northern Limestone Alps.

The transhumance system in the Alps has remained virtually unchanged since at least the High Middle Ages, with a document referring to a summer pasture from 1204. Along the edge of the Alps, starting around 1300 in west and central Switzerland and a little later in eastern Switzerland, cattle production became the primary agricultural activity. A number of specialized cattle markets grew up in Arona, Bellinzona, Como and Varese in the south and Villeneuve in the west. In these communities on the edge of the Alps, transhumance included both the vertical movement of cattle to the alpine pastures as well as horizontal movement to the cattle markets. In the communities located in the central Alps, the herds were more diverse. Generally there were large herds of sheep with much smaller cattle herds and other animals such as pigs and goats.

While the inhabitants of the Alps had practised transhumance for thousands of years, during the Late Middle Ages it became increasingly important as the population decreased following the Black Death and the wars of this era. Cattle production was much less manpower-intensive than farming, which was ideal with the reduced population. However, cattle production is much more capital- and especially land-intensive. Cattle production became an investment opportunity for monasteries and citizens of nearby cities. The investors would purchase the cattle and then rent the beasts out to small farmers or to herders for the summer. The smaller alpine communities generally did not want "foreign" cattle pastured in their alpine pastures, which led to conflicts between the alpine farming communities and the neighboring cities and monasteries. Conflicts over grazing rights and ownership of the alpine meadows led to several wars within what is now Switzerland, including the pivotal Battle of Morgarten (1315), which started due to a long-simmering feud between Schwyz and Einsiedeln Abbey.

=== Late 20th century ===
Since the late 20th century, Alpine regions face economical difficulties. Since 1980, around 64% of farms in the Alps have gone out of business. The structural change in agriculture is noticeable not only but especially in the Alpine region. Conflicts with the tourism and energy sectors as well as changed production conditions due to the climate crisis and demographic tendencies (depopulation, the ageing of the farming population, migration, lack of qualified alpine staff) are exacerbating the situation.

Thus, many regions turn to the expansion of their economic fields such as agritourism. In many regions, the extinction of businesses among subsistence farmers could be stopped through ecological compensation payments for comprehensive cultural landscape management and the production and marketing of high-quality food. An entry in UNESCO's intangible cultural heritage helps the alpine season to gain increased visibility and opens up new opportunities to support the continuation of this tradition.

An example for this is the declaration of Alpine transhumance in the Bregenz Forest as intangible cultural heritage in 2011 or the appointment of Bad Hindelang in the Allgäu Alps as "good practice example" for the preservation of alpine farming culture.

== Agriculture near the Alps ==
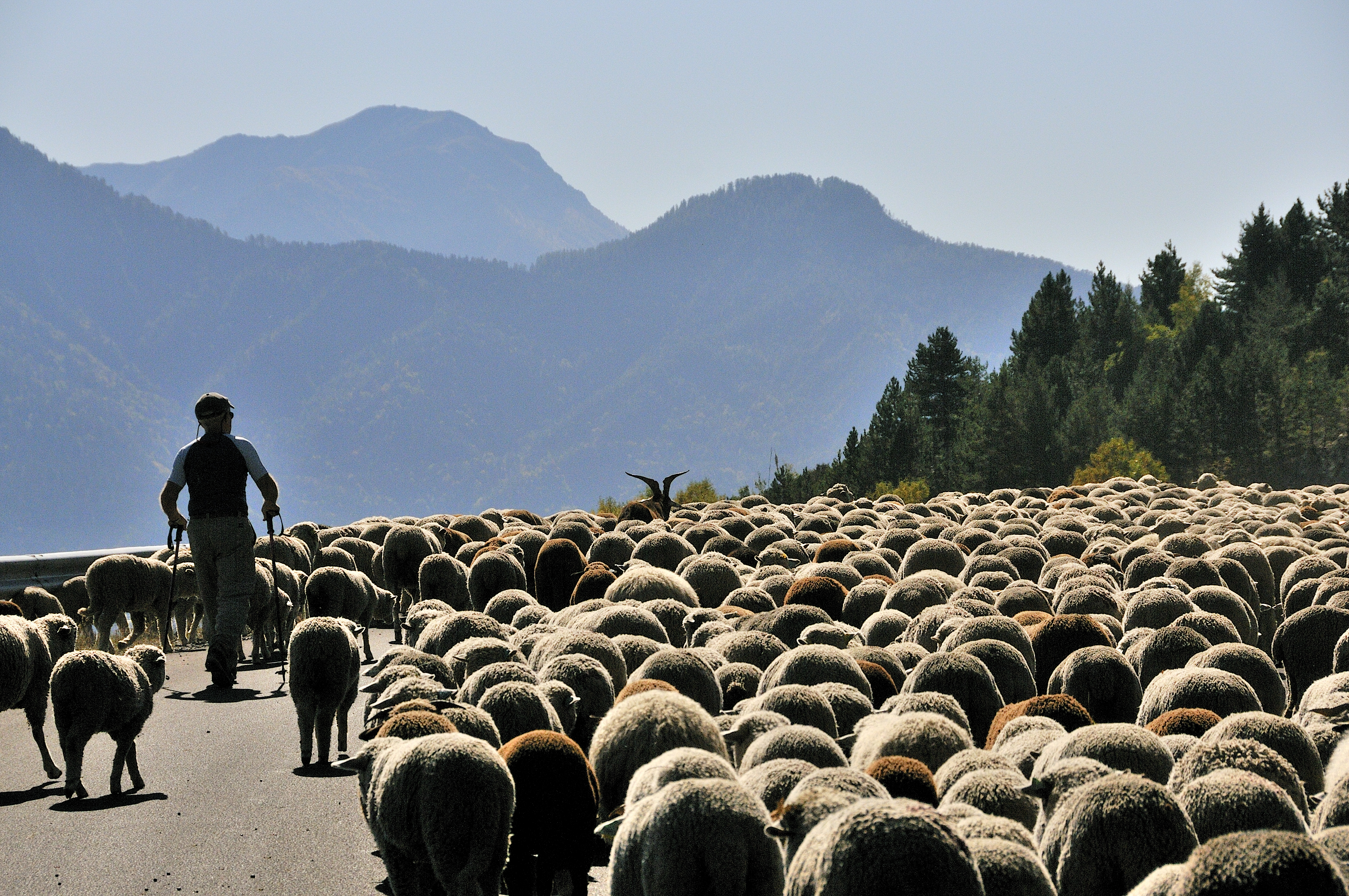
Transhumance in the Dauphiné Alps, France (2020)

In the valleys along the edge of the Alps, cattle production with associated transhumance was generally the rule. However, in the inner alpine valleys the climate was drier which allowed farming even at higher elevations. These areas tended to be mixed between farming and animal husbandry, with the animals being kept mainly for fertilizer and plowing rather than food.

However, in both regions the yearly movement was generally similar. Throughout the year, most of the population of the village remained on the valley floor and farmed the surrounding land for grains and hay. In the spring the herdsmen took the animals up to the middle pastures on the mountain slopes. In the summer, pigs were left in the middle pastures while the rest of the animals were moved to the high alpine pasture. At the end of September the animals were moved back to the lower pastures and cattle were stabled in the following month. Sheep and goats were stabled in December, unless the winter was mild, then they remained at the middle pastures with the pigs.

In the regions where breeding dominated, the farms were relatively large and isolated from each other. Where both breeding and farming were mixed, the plots were generally smaller and common fields were shared between the community. During the Middle Ages many fields were converted into meadows, because of the prevalence of the breeding. In the north the fields were rotated without a fallow period. They were cultivated for 2 to 5 years, then used as a meadow (and fertilized by the animals) for 3 to 10 years before going back under cultivation. However, in the mountain valleys, the fields near the communities were cultivated every year (sometimes producing two crops a year in Ticino) while the outer fields and alpine pastures were more often allowed to lie fallow or used as a meadow.

== Cheese production ==
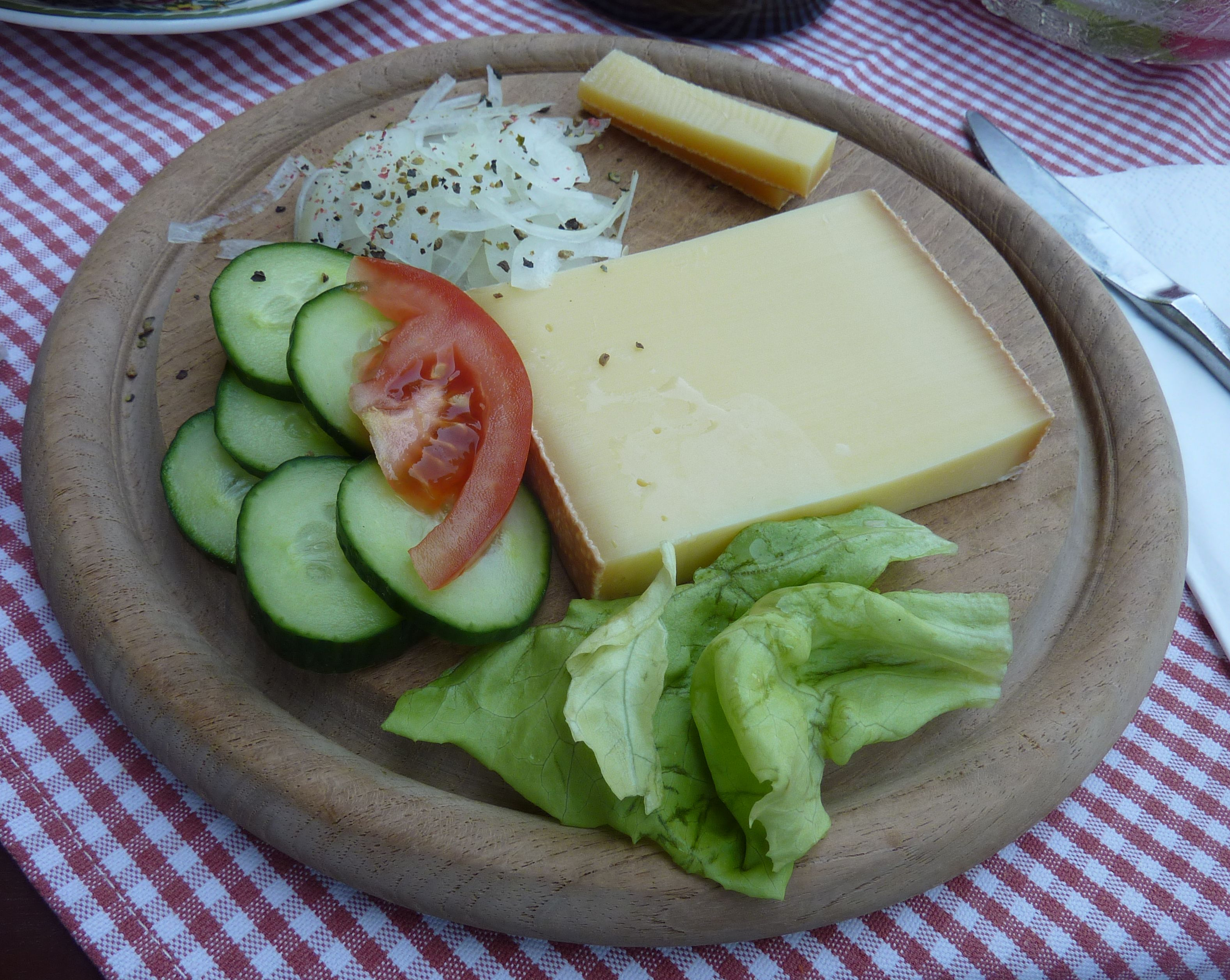
Bergkäse

Alpine transhumance has a strong impact on the production of cheese in the Alps. It ensures that cows, sheep and goats produce high-quality aromatic milk, the so-called Heumilch ("hay milk"), based on their special diet of natural meadow grasses. The use of hay milk in cheese production contributes to the distinctive flavour that determines more than 30 Alpine cheeses, including Alpkäse, Bergkäse, Sura Kees and Allgäuer Sennalpkäse. The chief shepherd in charge of the Alp and responsible for the cheese production is known as the Senn.

In Vorarlberg, is an association of farmers called Käsestraße Bregenzerwald has been established to boost the region's economy. This association aims at contributing to the maintenance of small scale agriculture, the diversity of local products in the Bregenz Forest and to strengthen the tourism sector. Members of the association include dairymen who will inform tourists about artisan cheese production.

== Culture and folklore ==
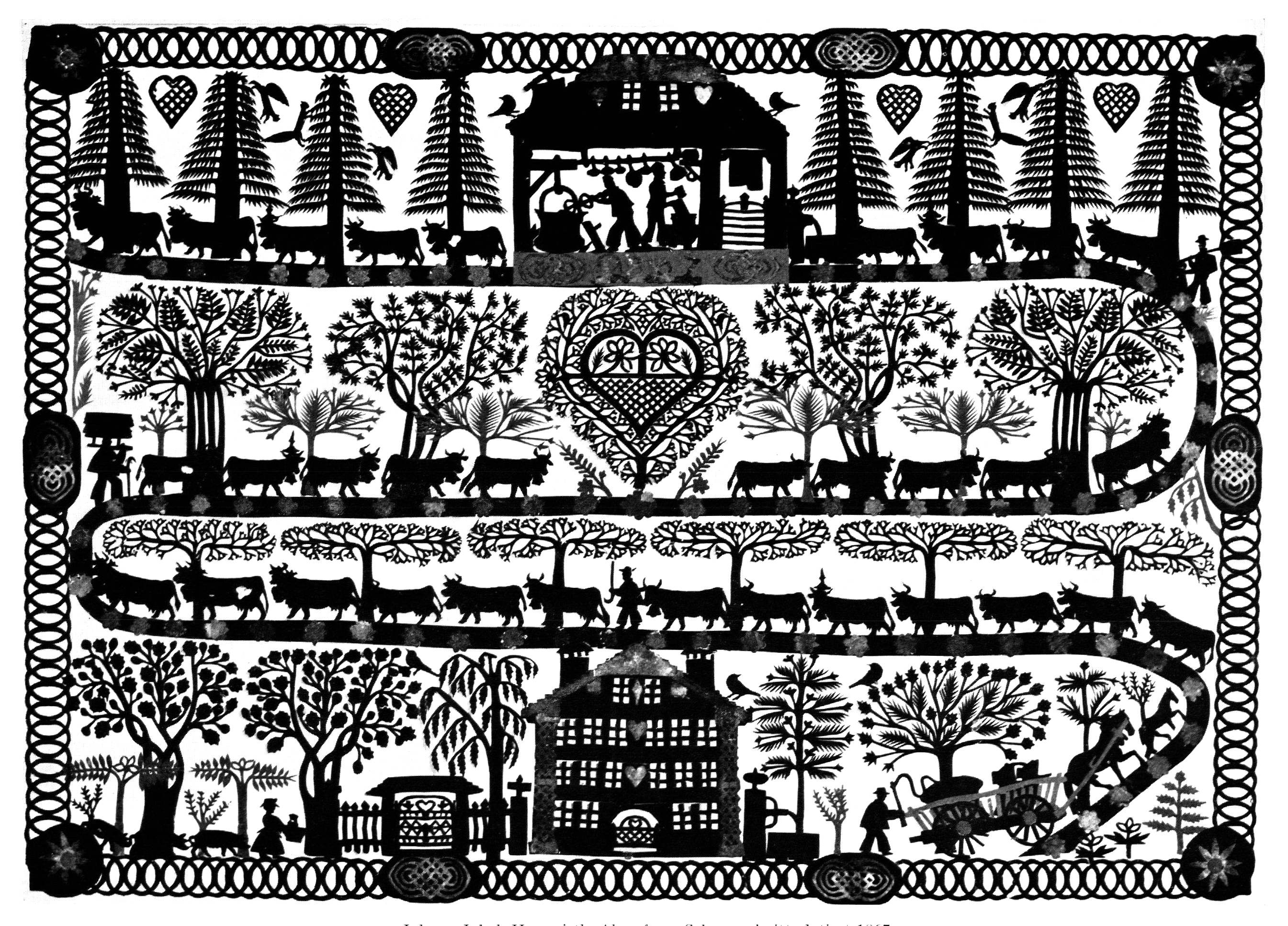
Swiss paper cutting depicting Alpine transhumance

Some people spent the winters isolated in the high pastures. In Johanna Spyri's novel Heidi, the "Alp-Öhi" ("high-pasture grandfather") is such a person, despising and despised by the villagers.

Transhumance contributes a great deal to traditional Alpine culture, such as Yodel, Alphorn or Schwingen. Swiss folklore also records many traditional tales about mythological creatures such as dwarves (Barbegazi, etc.) inhabiting the Alpine pastures, either helpful or causing mischief; in particular, this is to punish the cruelty or discourtesy of a bad Senn. In many cases, the stories tell about curses on specific Alps, appearances of the devil or spirits of earlier Sennen, etc.

== Statistics ==
In 1997, Austria had over 12,000 sites where 70,000 farmers took care of about 500,000 cattle. Alpine pastures amount to a quarter of the farmland.

Bavaria had 1,384 sites hosting 48,000 cattle, about half of them in Upper Bavaria and the other half in the Allgäu.

In Switzerland, about 380,000 cattle including 130,000 milk cows as well as 200,000 sheep are in summer on high pastures. Milk from cows here is usually made into local cheese specialities, handmade using traditional methods and tools. Alpine pastures amount to 35 percent of Swiss farmland and 13 percent of the entire country. The total population of mountain farmers has decreased to about 43,000 (in 1980) from 160,000 (in 1910). The farmers that are involved in mountain farming only make up about 15% of the total farming population in Switzerland.

== See also ==
- Animal husbandry
- History of the Alps
- List of valleys of the Alps
- Livestock transportation
- Lyoba
- Pastoralism
- Pre-Christian Alpine traditions
- Swiss folklore
