= Bezau =

- Municipality
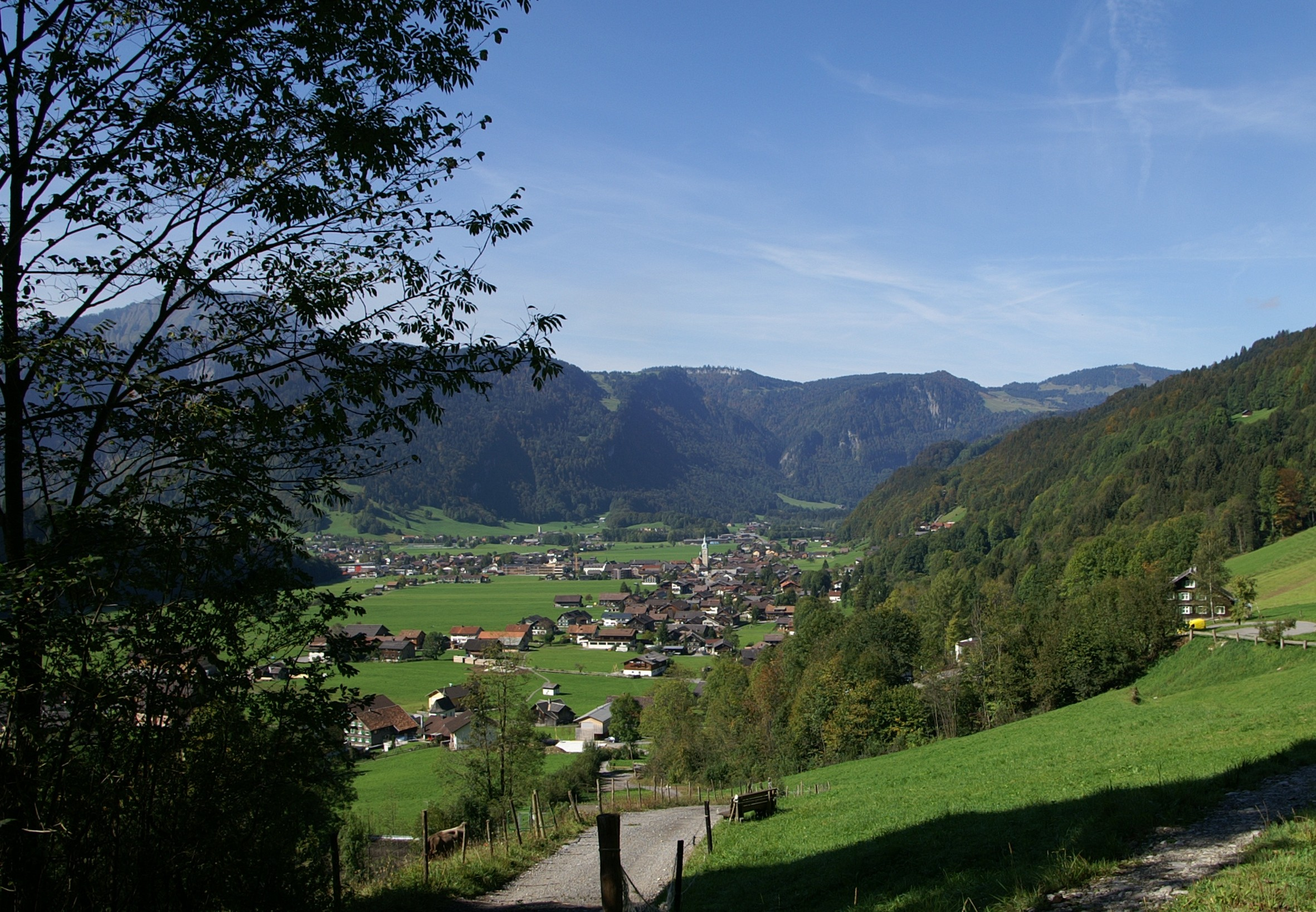

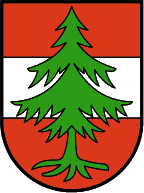
- Coat of arms

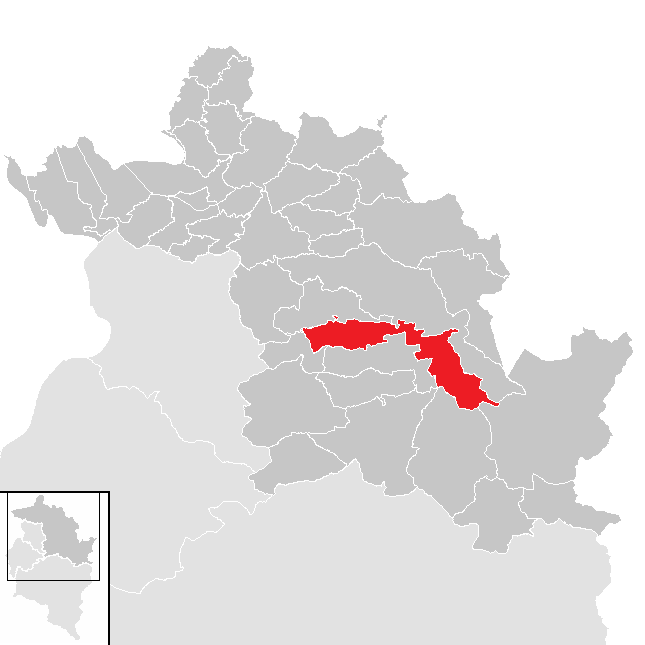
- Location in the district

- Location within Austria
- Coordinates: 47°23′06″N 09°54′06″E
- Country: Austria
- State: Vorarlberg
- District: Bregenz

Government
  - Mayor: Georg Fröwis

Area
  - Total: 34.41 km^{2} (13.29 sq mi)
- Elevation: 650 m (2,130 ft)

Population (2018-01-01)
  - Total: 2,003
  - Density: 58.21/km^{2} (150.8/sq mi)
- Time zone: UTC+1 (CET)
  - Summer (DST): UTC+2 (CEST)
- Postal code: 6870
- Area code: 05514
- Vehicle registration: B
- Website: www.bezau.at

Bezau is a town in the Bregenz Forest region, in the western Austrian state of Vorarlberg. It is part of the district of Bregenz. Bezau is a popular tourist destination around the year, due to its vicinity to ski resorts and hiking trails. Its picturesque church was built in 1906 and has as its patron saint St. Jodok. Another attraction is the museum of local history (Heimatmuseum), which is housed in a traditional Bregenz Forest wooden home.

== Geography ==
Bezau has a surface area of 34.42 km^{2} and is one of the largest municipalities in the central Bregenz Forest.

== Population ==
Historical population
| Year | Pop. | ±% |
|---|---|---|
| 1869 | 979 | — |
| 1880 | 926 | −5.4% |
| 1890 | 923 | −0.3% |
| 1900 | 1,003 | +8.7% |
| 1910 | 1,140 | +13.7% |
| 1923 | 1,172 | +2.8% |
| 1934 | 1,295 | +10.5% |
| 1939 | 1,228 | −5.2% |
| 1951 | 1,468 | +19.5% |
| 1961 | 1,484 | +1.1% |
| 1971 | 1,559 | +5.1% |
| 1981 | 1,554 | −0.3% |
| 1991 | 1,708 | +9.9% |
| 2001 | 1,878 | +10.0% |
| 2011 | 1,975 | +5.2% |

== History ==
Bezau was first documented as "Baezenowe" in 1249. After the construction of its own church in 1497, Bezau became an autonomous parish. In 1656, a Capuchin monastery was founded there. Since 1806, Bezau has served as a district court for the Bregenzerwald region. In 1902, the Bregenzerwaldbahn, a 35.32 km narrow-gauge railway, was inaugurated. This railway linked Bregenz with Bezau until 1983.

=== Heraldry ===
The coat of arms is red with a silver horizontal band through it, depicting a green uprooted spruce tree surrounded by a bronze frame. It has been in use since 1929.

== Education ==
There is one "Polytechnische Schule," one primary school (grades 1-4), one middle school (junior high, grades 5-8) and one upper secondary business school (Bundeslehranstalt: Handelsschule, Fachschule für wirtschaftliche Berufe, Tourismusfachschule).

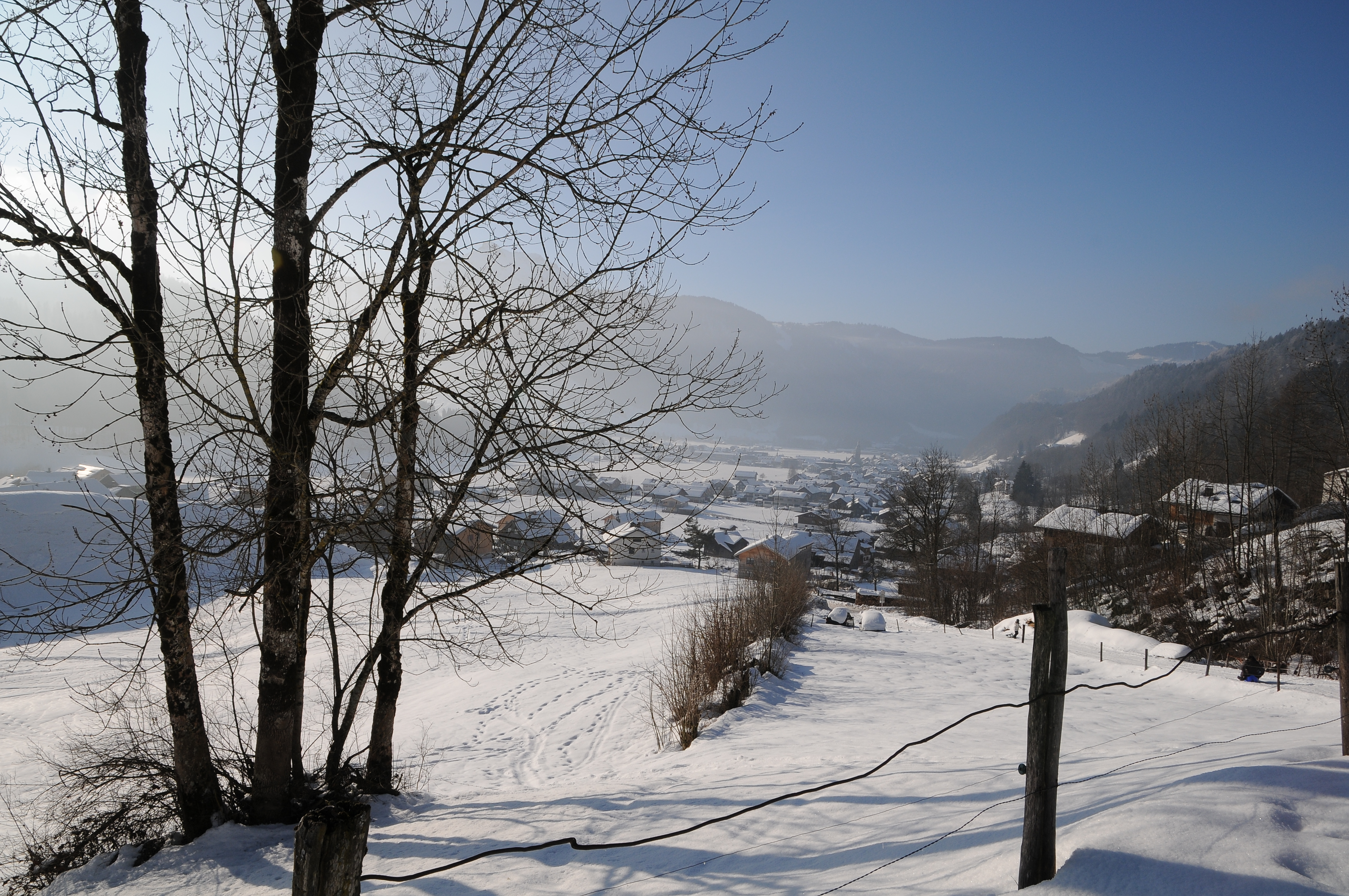
Bezau in winter

== Economy ==
With 46 farms and 656 hectares of agricultural land, Bezau benefits from a strong agricultural sector. In addition, some cheese factories are located in Bezau. The dairy "Obere" processes approximately 680,000 liters of milk annually. The dairy "Kriechere" processes about 400,000 liters of milk p.a, of which approximately 90% is traditionally processed into a regional specialty cheese (Bergkäse). In 2013, another dairy, which is part of the Käsestraße Bregenzerwald, opened.

36 companies, 37 craft businesses, 18 tourist companies and 30 service providers are located in Bezau. Bezau has a workforce of around 360 employees.

== Culture and sights ==
From the beginning of June to the end of October, the weekly market takes place every Friday on the Bezau village square.

Bezau Beatz is an annual music festival that has been taking place in Bezau in August since 2008. The concerts take place in various locations: in the depot of the Bregenz Forest Railway, an art forge, the parish church of St. Jodok Bezau or the Panorama Restaurant Baumgarten.

Between May and October it is possible to ride 5 km of the historic Bregenzerwaldbahn ("Wälderbähnle"), which links Bezau to Reuthe and Schwarzenberg.

The Heimatmuseum Bezau (a local heritage museum) includes a typical Bregenzerwälder farm that offers insights into the traditional way of life of this region.

Bezau is part of the Bregenzerwald Umgang (Bregenz Forest Walk). This walking tour offers insights into the architecture and community planning of 12 traditional villages in the Bregenzerwald. While walking over various landscapes, visiting public buildings, homes and everyday objects, walkers gain a comprehensive overview of typical Bregenzerwald architectural styles as they developed throughout the ages.

== International relations ==
Bezau is the twin city of:

- Heiden Switzerland

== Notable people ==
- Anton Innauer (*1958), ski jumper.

== Photo gallery ==
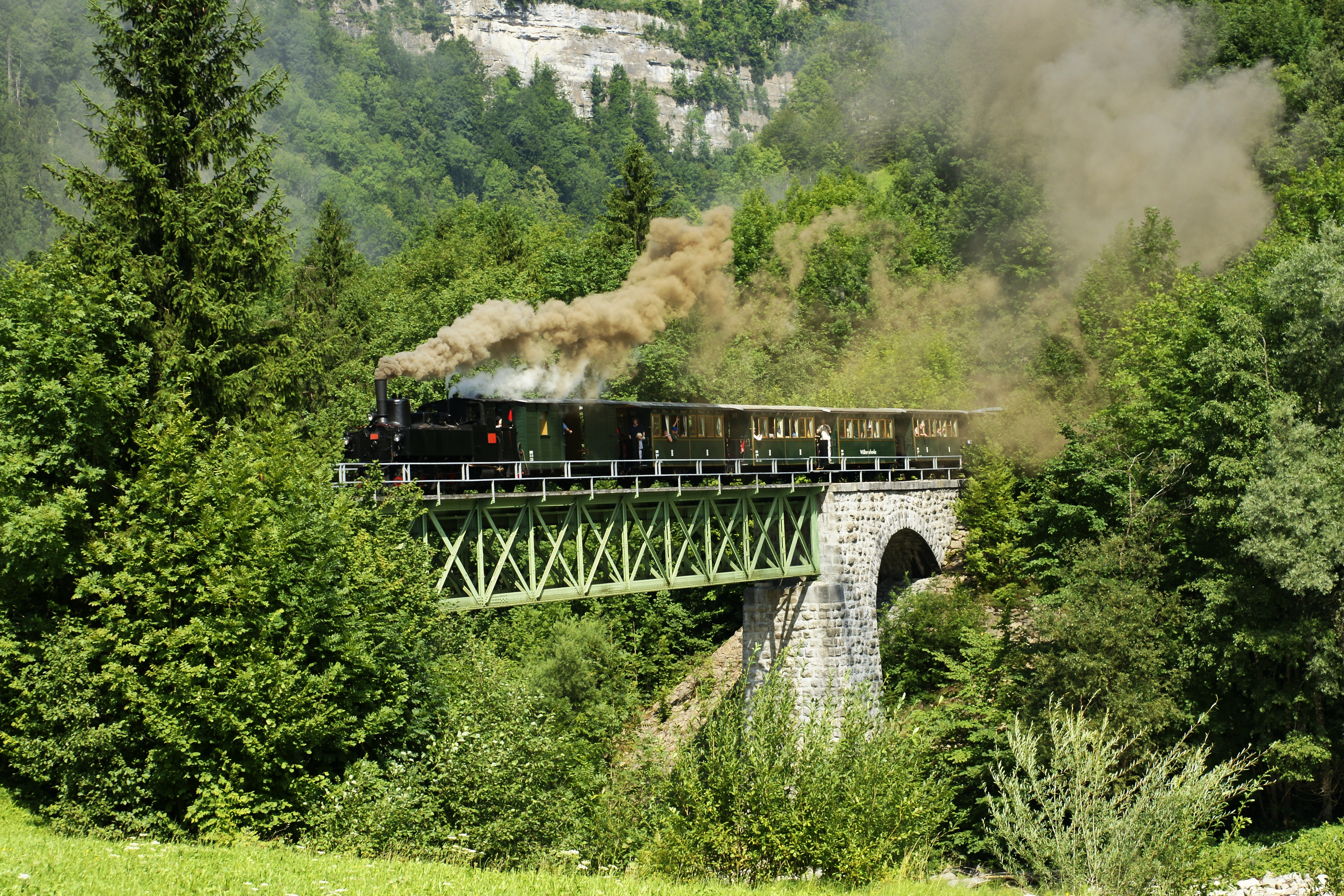
The museum railway Bregenzerwaldbahn

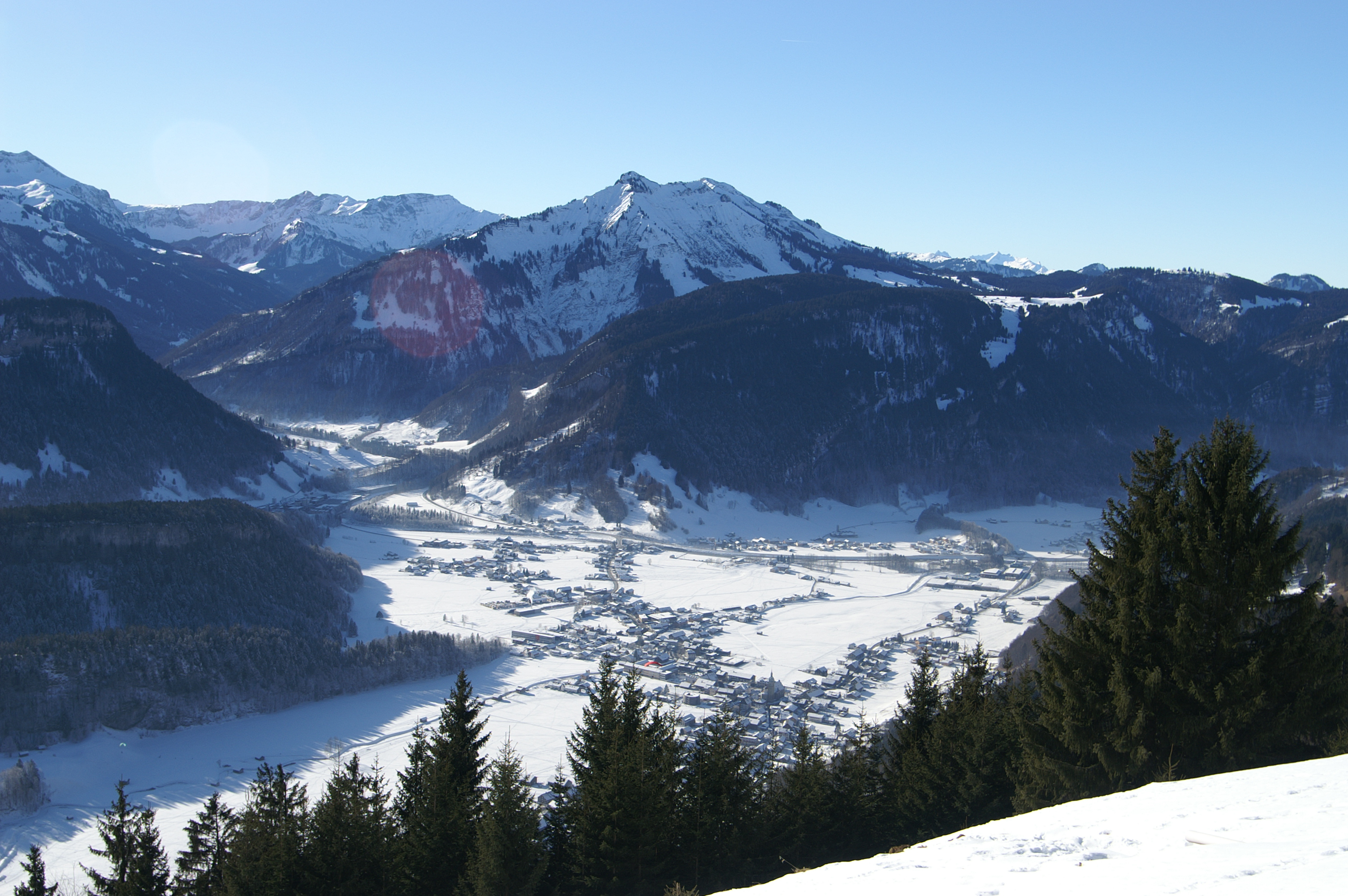
The village of Bezau in the winter time
