= Vorarlberger Bergkäse =

Austrian medium-hard Alpine cheese

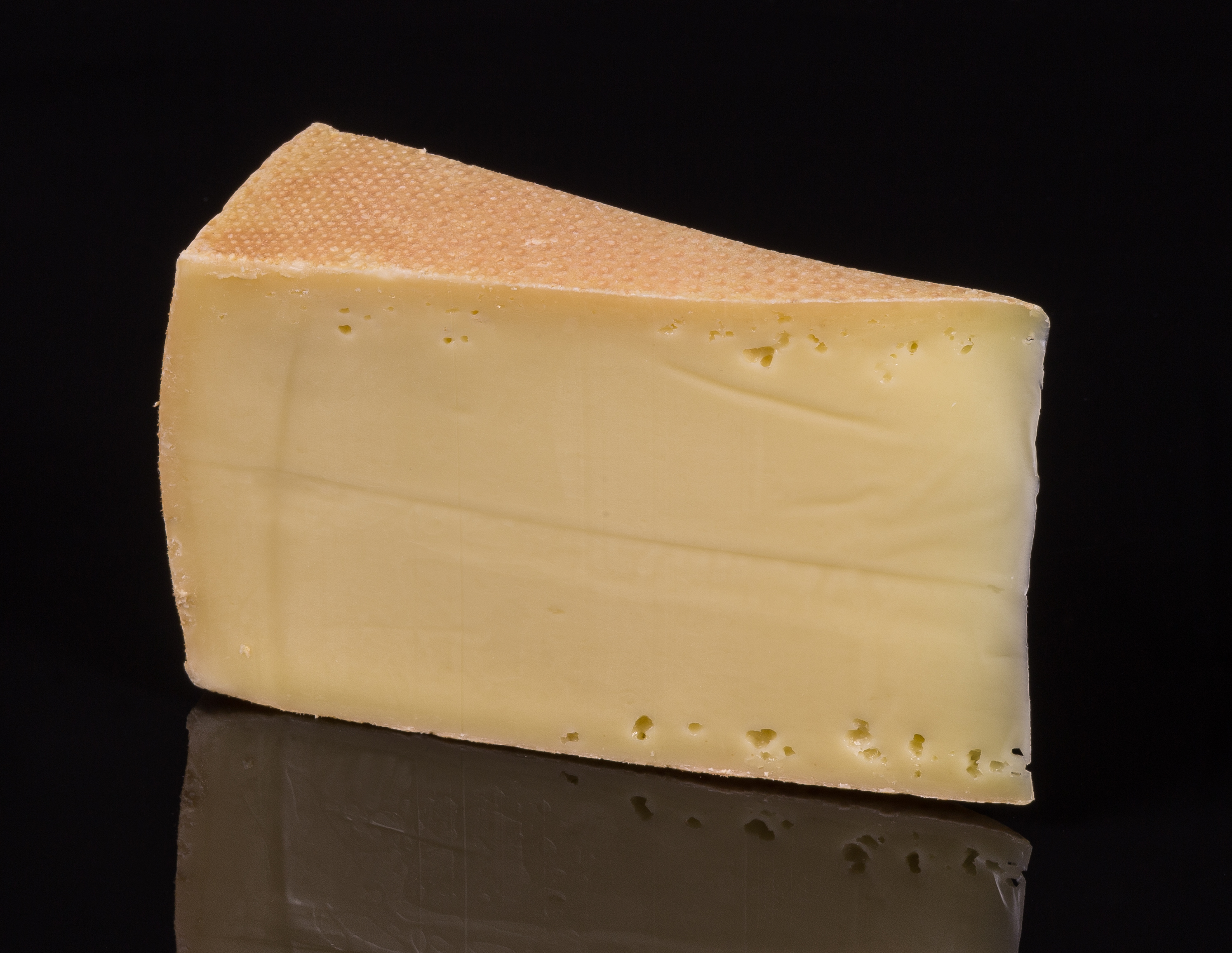
- Country of origin: Austria
- Region: Bregenz Forest, Vorarlberg
- Source of milk: Cows; hay milk
- Texture: firm to hard, long-matured varieties may be crumbly
- Fat content: 45% i. Tr. ("in der Trockenmasse")
- Weight: up to 35 kg
- Certification: PDO (since 1997)
- Named after: Vorarlberg

Vorarlberger Bergkäse (German for 'Vorarlberg mountain cheese') is a regional cheese specialty from the Austrian state of Vorarlberg. It is protected within the framework of the European designation of origin (PDO).

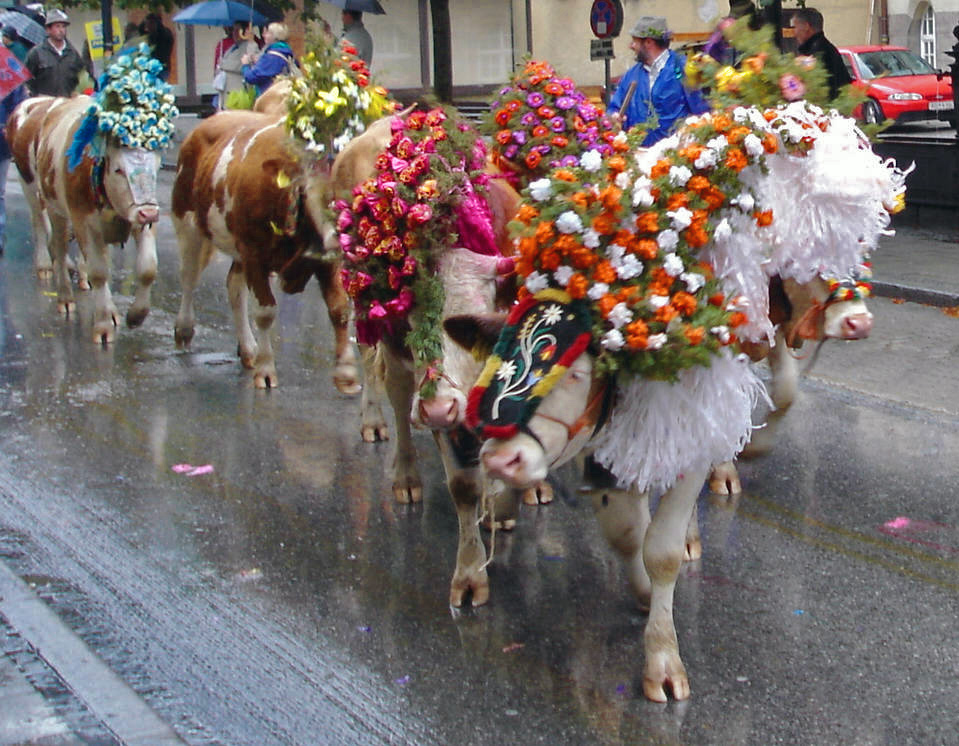
Almabtrieb: In autumn, the cattle are moved down from a mountain pasture at moderate altitude. Traditionally, this is seen as an occasion for celebrations.

== Characteristics ==
Vorarlberger Bergkäse matures for 3 to 6 months, some even for up to 2 years and longer. It has a typical round loaf shape with a diameter of around 55 to 65 cm and a weight of up to 35 kg. The Bregenzerwald Bergkäse has small holes that are considered a quality feature. The aroma ranges from mild to spicy, the taste is nutty and has typical herbal notes. The fat content is 45% i. Tr. ("in der Trockenmasse").

== Production ==
Vorarlberger Bergkäse is made exclusively from natural raw milk in accordance with the specifications that were defined for the protection of the term and only in alpine dairies in the Bregenz Forest, in the Großwalsertal and in the Kleinwalsertal, in the Leiblachtal (Pfänderstock), and in the Rhine Valley.

=== Traditional agriculture ===
In the Bregenz Forest, the centuries-old management of pastures (alpine transhumance) is still practiced. It means that the cows are kept on pastures at different heights on the mountains depending on the season so that the cows get fresh feed on the mountain pastures between May and October, while the valley meadows provide the hay for the winter. "Silo feeding" is therefore not necessary. The milk is then processed directly in the mountain alps in summer and used to make Alpkäse, while from the beginning of October to the end of May the milk is processed into Bergkäse.

=== Quality control ===
The production of Vorarlberger Bergkäse may only take place by means of manual production using traditional methods. Strict quality regulations apply to the raw milk used: Only farms with predominantly grassland farming without silage production or feeding ("hay milk") are allowed to provide milk for Vorarlberger Bergkäse. This must also be delivered to the dairy at least once a day and processed there immediately.

== History ==
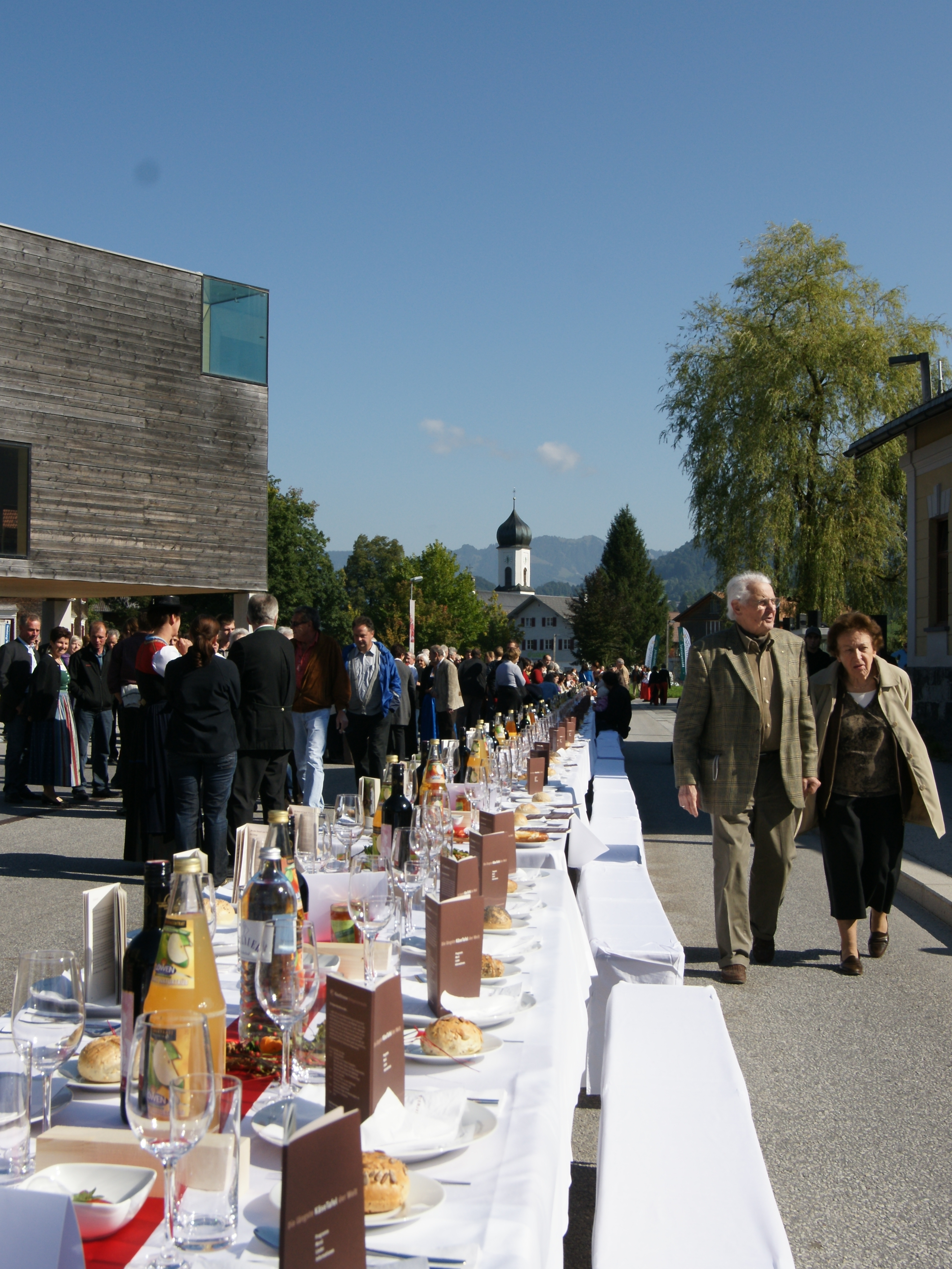
For the 10th anniversary, the KäseStrasse Bregenzerwald prepared a cheese table in Andelsbuch in 2008. It was recognised as the longest cheese table in the world (500 m) by the Guinness book of the records.

The production of cheese has a long tradition in the Bregenz Forest. The Celts first brought the region into contact with livestock and alpine agriculture. They used alpine pastures and already practiced professional Alpine cheese making. However, until the second half of the 17th century, mainly sour cheese was made. After the end of the Thirty Years' War (1618–1648), herdsmen from the neighboring canton of Appenzell in Switzerland came to the Bregenz Forest. They brought the art of so-called "fat senning" with them and taught it to the Bregenz Forest farmers. By fat senning, the milk is not skimmed, but cheese is made from the whole milk. This is how hard cheese is made. The fat senning in Vorarlberg resulted in the emergence of Vorarlberger Bergkäse. Only natural rennet is used.

In the middle of the 18th century, so much hard cheese was being produced in Vorarlberg that it was no longer possible to sell it in Vorarlberg alone, so that it was professionally organised and sold mainly to Italy.

=== Cheese production in recent times ===
With the aim to support and preserve the local dairy production and the traditional agricultural heritage, the Bregenz Forest Cheese Route was founded in 1998. It is an organisation which connects farmers, traders and craftsmen. Along the cheese route, visitors are invited to watch the cheese production process and participate in culinary tastings.

== See also ==
- Sura Kees ("sour cheese" from the Alpine region)
- Alpkäse
- List of Austrian cheeses
- List of European cheeses with protected geographical status
