= Bregenz Forest Railway =

Coordinates: 47°22′55″N 9°53′45″E

Bregenz–Bezau
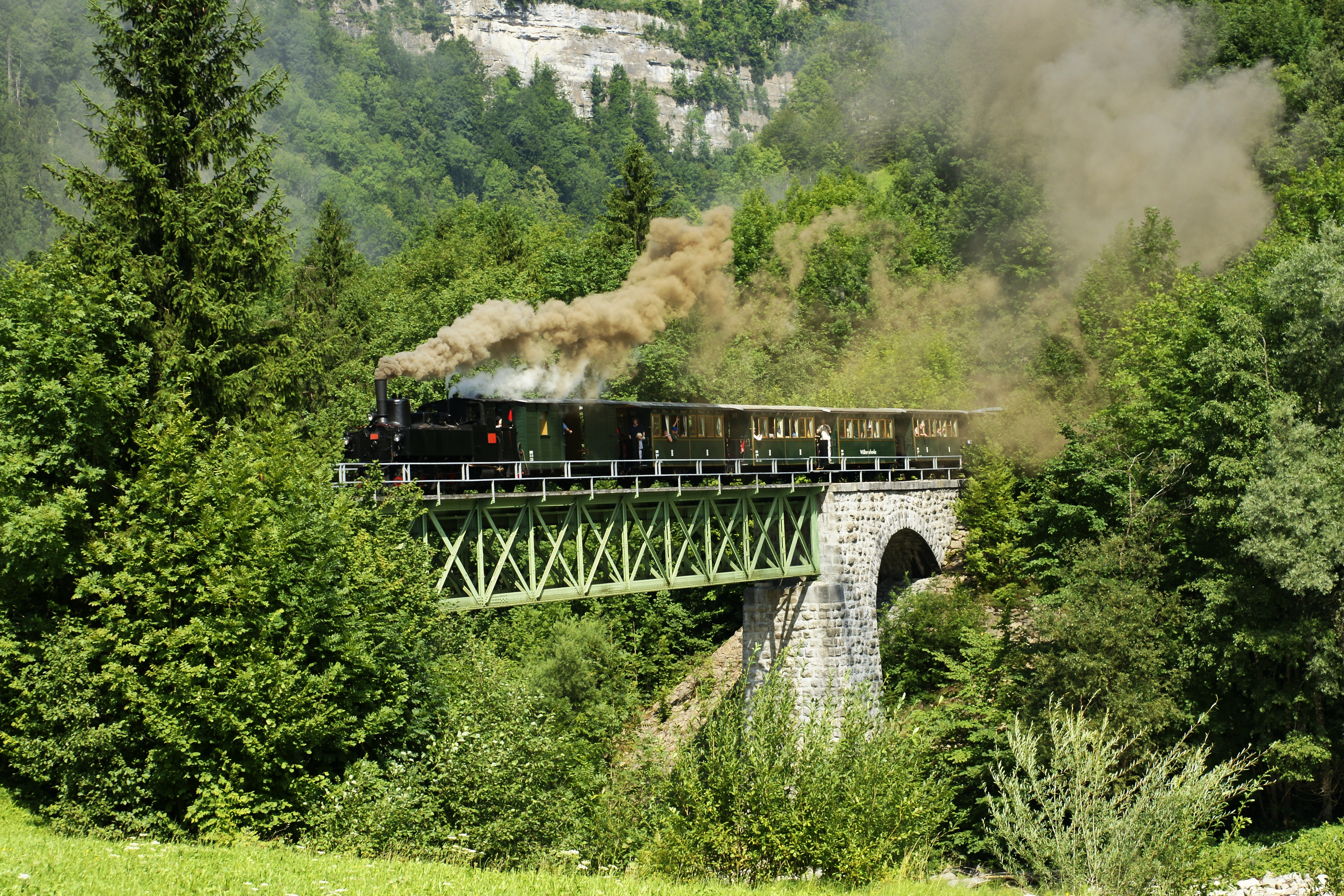
- A steam train on the Sporenegg Bridge

Technical
- Line length: 35.33 km (21.95 mi)
- Track gauge: 760 mm (2 ft 5 15/16 in)

The Bregenz Forest Railway (German: Bregenzerwaldbahn, known colloquially as the Wälderbahn or Wälderbähnle), is an Austrian narrow gauge railway with a track gauge of 760 mm (2 ft 5 15/16 in), the so-called Bosnian gauge. It runs through the state of Vorarlberg and from 1902 to 1983 linked Bregenz on Lake Constance with Bezau in the Bregenz Forest on a 35.33-kilometre-long (21.95 mi) railway line. Today only a 5.01-kilometre-long (3.11 mi) section is still worked as a heritage railway. The remaining line has been closed and largely lifted.

== Heritage railway ==
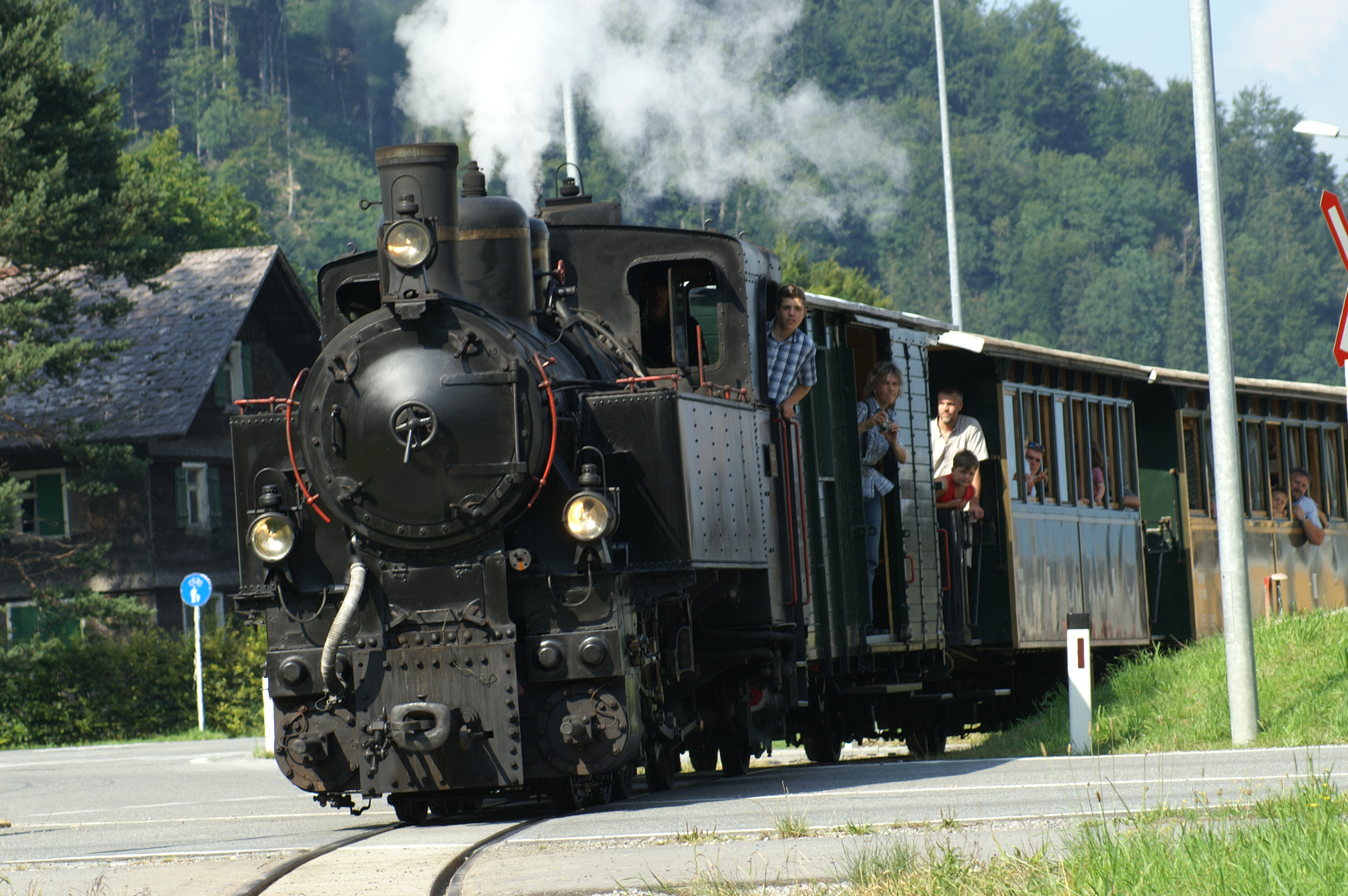
The Bregenz Forest Railway as a tourist attraction in 2007.

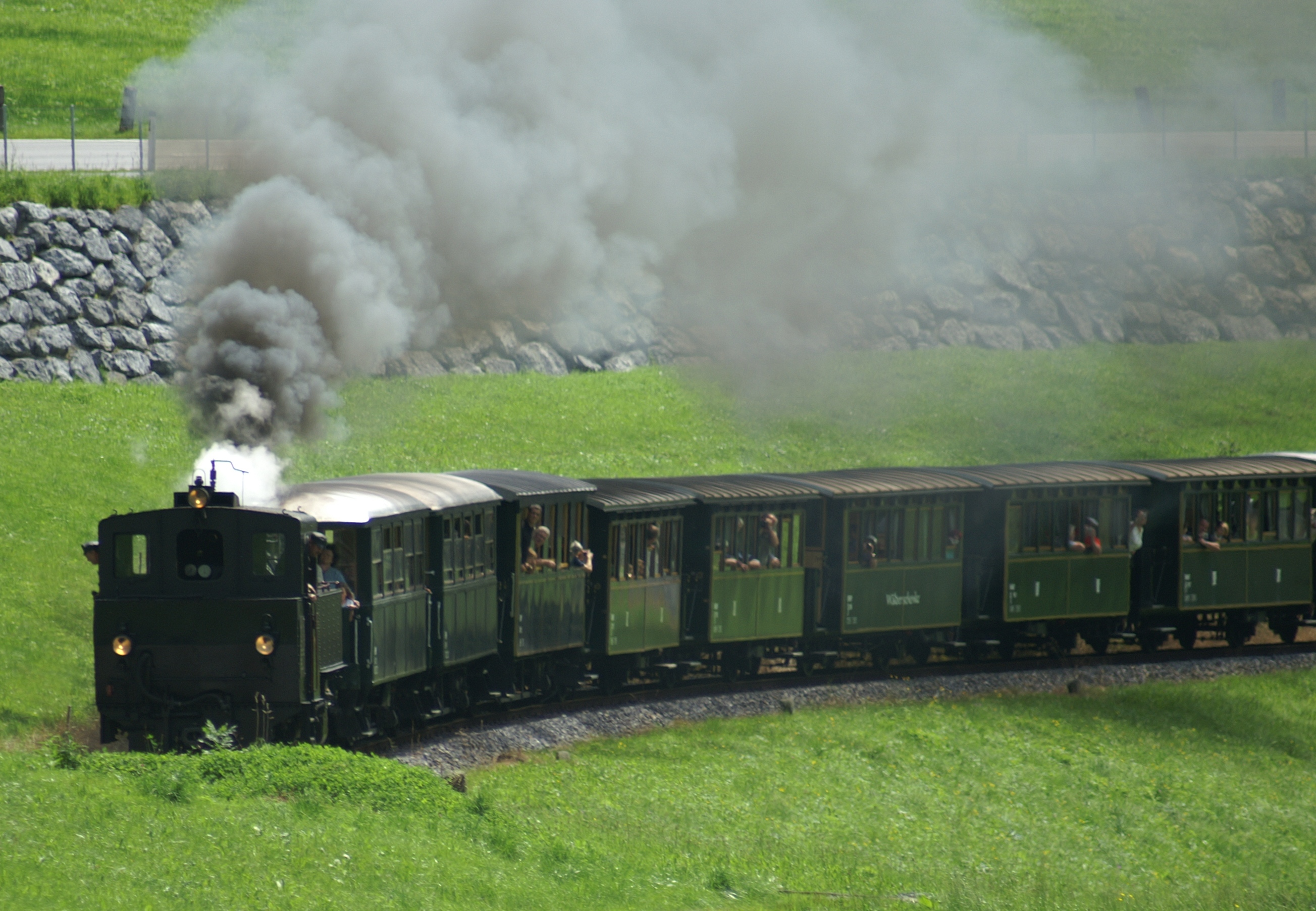
Tourist service in August 2007.

In 1985 the Bregenz Forest Railway Society (Verein Bregenzerwaldbahn-Museumsbahn) was founded in order to at least preserve sections of the line and to operate it as a heritage railway. The original vehicles had, however, all been transported away, which is why operations began in 1987 only with the help of rolling stock procured from other lines, including a regauged trailer car from the Stubai Valley Railway. The line was opened from Bezau as far as Schwarzenberg station. The first powered vehicle was a lorry converted to a railbus. Several small diesel locomotives and other wagons from the Stubai Valley Railway were procured the following year and a further section of line to the Bersbuch station was reactivated.

The first steam locomotive at the museum railway arrived in the early 1990s - the former 798.101 "Nicki S." - on loan when it had become superfluous as a result of the closure of the Jagst Valley Railway. In 1993, the U.25 was renovated to become the first operational steam locomotive - a "Class U" - from the original Bregenz Forest Railway. In 2001 it was followed by a second steam engine, the Uh. The passenger coaches required were built on the chassis of goods wagons. The 1999 Pentecost flood destroyed the Sporenegg bridge and it was rebuilt in June 2000. The 2005 European floods caused further damage to the trackbed, and flooding of Bezau station. This was repaired within a few weeks.

Today the museum railway services operate on the remaining section of line from Bezau to Schwarzenberg. An extension to Andelsbuch, or even beyond that to Egg, was considered. However, in October 2004, the line had to be shortened by 1.1 km (0.68 mi) (and a new Schwarzenberg terminus built), because the line between Schwarzenberg and Bersbuch was given up in favour of a road expansion project. Furthermore, the Railway Society had to forfeit land at the Bezau station for the building of a supermarket. As a replacement for the locomotive shed, a new vehicle and workshop hall was built and, in place of a set of points, a sector table was built at the end of the line in order to make optimum use of the remaining space.

== Literature ==
- Markus Rabanser, Martin Hebenstreit: Die Bregenzerwaldbahn. Hecht-Verlag, 1989, ISBN 3-85430-106-5
- Krobot, Slezak, Sternhart: Schmalspurig durch Österreich. 4th ed., Verlag Slezak, 1991, ISBN 3-85416-095-X
- Lothar Beer: Eine Bahn im Rhythmus der Zeit - Die Geschichte der Bregenzerwald-Museumsbahn. Hecht-Verlag, 2007, ISBN 978-3-85298-147-5
- Norbert Fink: Die Bregenzerwaldbahn 1902-1983 illustrated book, Sutton Verlag comments and press release accessible online
