= Trailing of the Sheep =

Annual October festival in Idaho, U.S.

Trailing of the Sheep is an annual October festival and parade in Sun Valley, Ketchum and Hailey, Idaho. It is held each fall to move the flocks off the mountain to their winter grazing homes. It is similar to the Almabtrieb in Austria, and is intended as a celebration of the history and tradition of sheep husbandry in the Western United States.

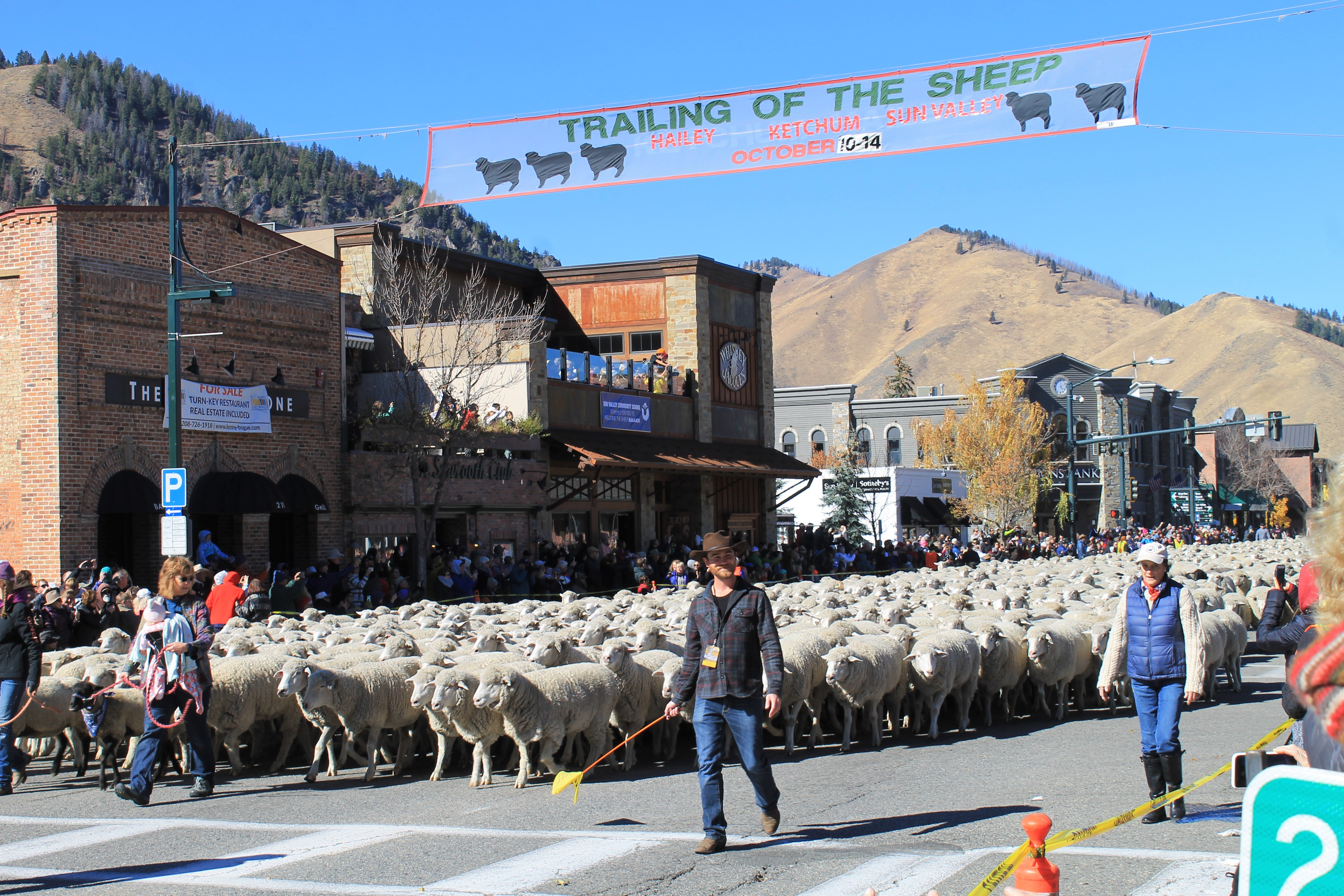
Trailing of the Sheep Parade 2018

== See also ==
- Grazing
