= Bergkäse =

Several varieties of hard cheese produced in the Alps

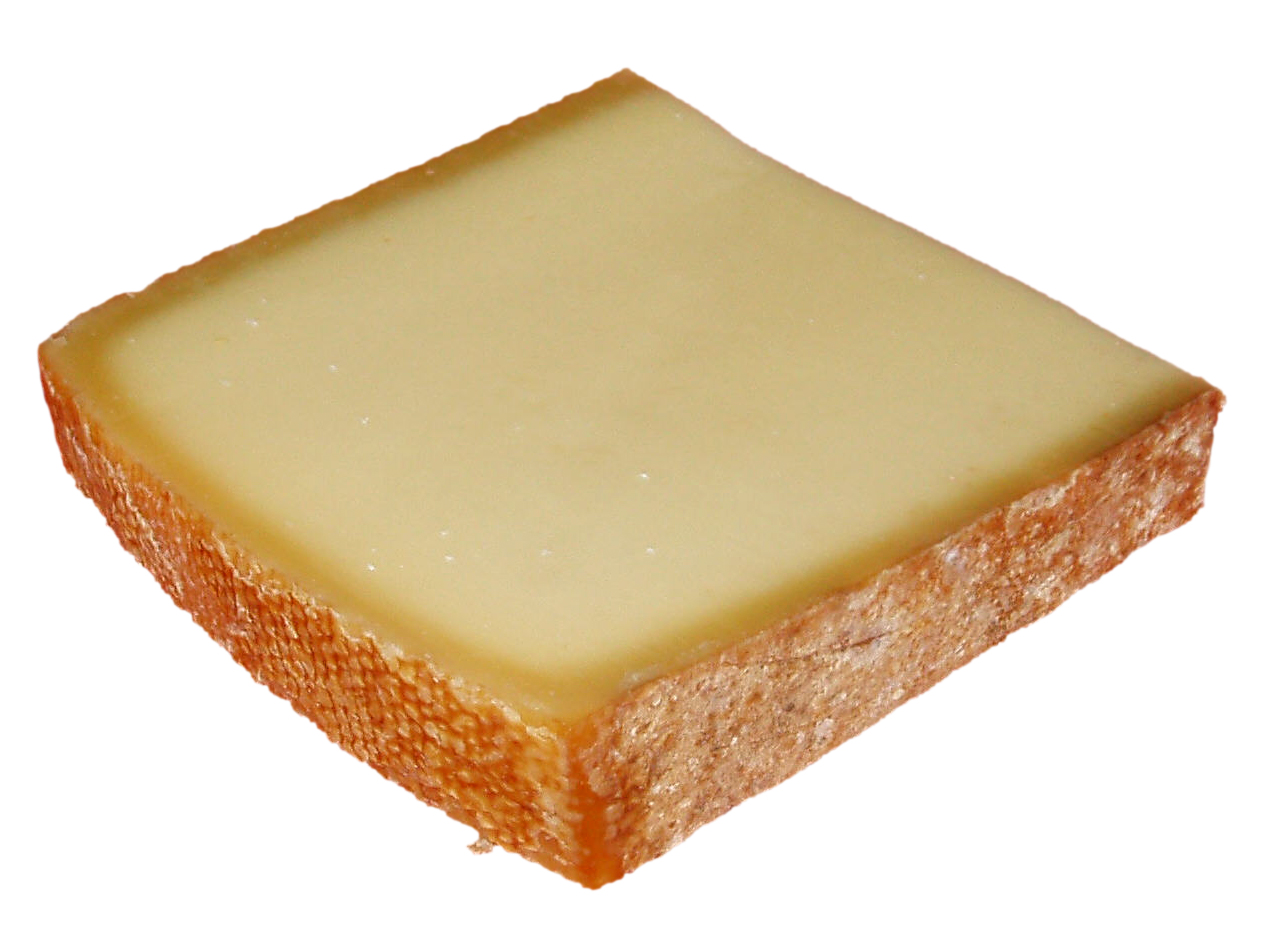
Allgäuer mountain cheese (Allgäuer Bergkäse) from the Allgäu region, matured for twelve months

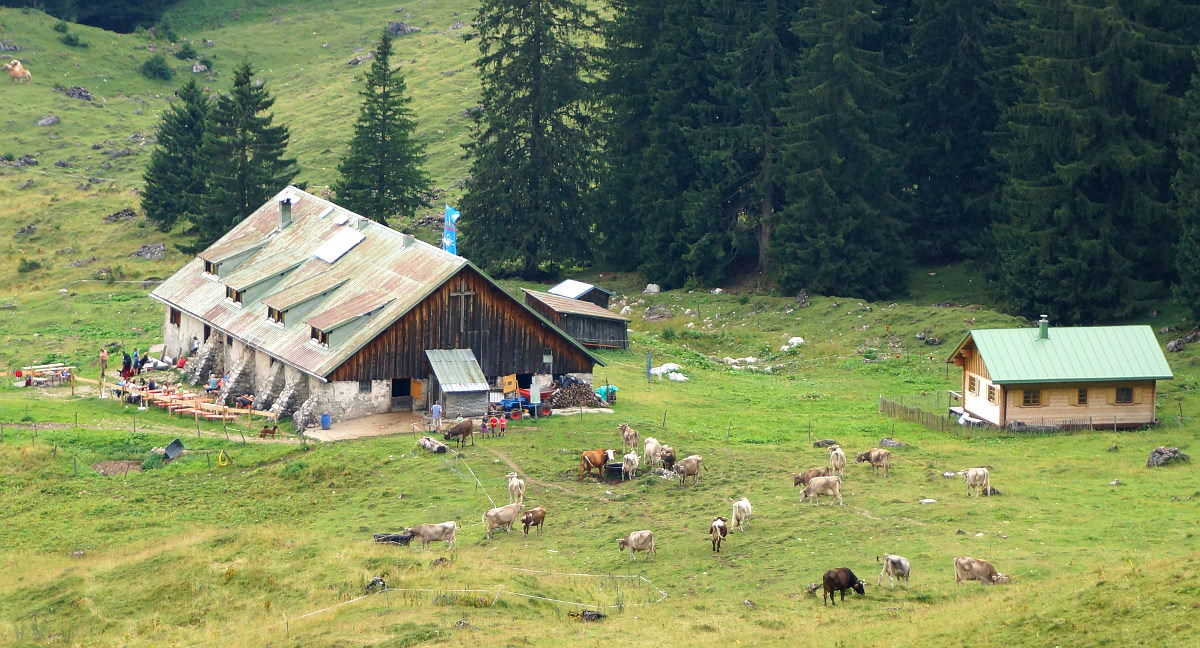
Cows on the Willersalpe in Allgäu, where mountain cheese is produced

Bergkäse (German for 'mountain cheese') refers to a number of varieties of cheese produced in the Alps. This includes products of mountain farming, the cultivation of alpine pastures as well as the milk processing of local producers in dairies. The term does not say much about the type or production method of the product called mountain cheese, which is usually a hard or semi-hard cheese with no or little holes (also called eyes), usually with a natural rind, but there are also semi-hard cheeses and soft cheeses under this designation. The term is used also generically (especially in Austria) for Swiss-type or Alpine cheeses, which resemble these in taste and texture but do not come from one of the traditional cheese making regions. The texture is rather hard, sometimes with small holes or cracks, the flavour strong and often a bit nutty.

== History ==
In earlier times, almost all cheeses produced in mountainous regions in summer were mountain cheeses in the sense that they were cheesed on the mountain, i.e. on the shieling. This took place during the summer months in the period lasting between about 70 and 120 days, depending on the region and altitude, when the cattle grazed the mountain meadows. The animals were then outdoors almost continuously and found particularly juicy and rich fodder with plenty of herbs, which resulted in special quality and spicy taste of the mountain milk. As transport possibilities were limited, it was obvious to cheese this milk and thus at the same time to concentrate and preserve it by dehydration. After the cattle had left the mountain pastures (Almabtrieb in German), the quality of the fodder deteriorated and the milk yield of the cows dropped. In winter, the milk was usually just enough for the farm's self-sufficiency, and there was hardly any cheese-making left.

In the mountain Canton of Grisons in Switzerland, 225 alpine pastures were occupied by dairy cows in 2020. Around half of these were still alpine dairy farms and produced cheese directly on the alp. From the other alps, the milk is transported to the valley for processing. Both vehicles and cable cars are used for this. In the past, finished cheese wheels were often transported down to the valley on sledges, but today this is sometimes even done by helicopter. The cheese is then transported back down to the alpine pastures.

== National ==
=== Legal situation under European law ===
In the European Union, the term Bergkäse (mountain cheese) is not protected in isolation as a protected designation of origin (PDO), protected geographical indication (PGI) or as a traditional specialities guaranteed (TSG). In EU law, the use of the PDO seal is permitted for some registered mountain cheeses, provided that the provisions are complied with. In Germany and Austria, producers of genuine mountain cheese in some regions have recently started to have the designations of their cheese protected and/or to have the authenticity confirmed by a seal of a monitoring association or similar (geographical indication) in order to enable consumers to buy high-quality alpine cheese even far away from the dairies of origin and to protect their product from cheap imitations.

=== Austria ===
In Austria, Bergkäse is produced in the states of Vorarlberg and Tyrol. The Vorarlberger Bergkäse, Vorarlberger Alpkäse and Tiroler Alpkäse are protected within the framework of the European designation of origin (PDO). The cheeses are subject to strict quality controls.

The production of Vorarlberger Bergkäse may only take place by means of manual production using traditional methods. Strict quality regulations apply to the raw milk used: Only farms with predominantly grassland farming without silage production or feeding ("haymilk") are allowed to provide milk for Vorarlberger Bergkäse. Moreover, the hay milk must be delivered to the dairy at least once a day and be processed there immediately.

=== Germany ===
In Germany, the designation Bergkäse may be used for a standard variety according to the Cheese Ordinance (KäseV). The designation as Bergkäse is linked to compliance with certain production regulations and to a certain quality. Milk and buttermilk obtained therefrom, cream, sweet whey, sour whey and whey cream may be used for production; thickening may only be carried out by removing water; in addition, only certain spices, also in the form of spice preparations, and their corresponding flavourings with natural flavouring substances may be used in production, which are indicated separately. The minimum fat content is full-fat stage, the minimum dry matter content is specified as 62%.

=== Switzerland ===
In Switzerland, both Alpkäse and Bergkäse are protected terms under the Mountain and Alpine Ordinance SR 910.19 of 8 November 2006. Bernese Alpine Cheese (Bernese Alpkäse) and Valais Alpine Cheese (Valais Alpkäse) also have the AOP seal. Grisons Mountain Cheese (Bündner Bergkäse) is produced exclusively in village cheese dairies at over 1000 m.

== Varieties ==
- Austria – Tiroler Bergkäse (PDO)
- Austria – Tyrolean grey cheese (PDO)
- Austria – Vorarlberger Bergkäse (PDO)
- France – Bargkass
- France – Beaufort (PDO)
- France – Cantal (PDO)
- France – Comté cheese (PDO)
- France – Laguiole (PDO)
- France – Tomme de Savoie (PGI)
- Germany – Allgäuer Bergkäse (PDO)
- Italy – Battelmatt
- Italy – Fontina (PDO)
- Italy – Montasio (PDO)
- Italy – Piora
- Italy – Pustertaler
- Poland – Bryndza Podhalańska (PGI)
- Poland – Oscypek (PGI)
- Portugal – Queijo Serra da Estrela (PGI)
- Spain – Roncal (PDO)
- Switzerland – Appenzeller cheese
- Switzerland – Berner Alpkäse (PDO)
- Switzerland – Grisons mountain cheese
- Switzerland – Emmentaler (PDO)
- Switzerland – Vacherin Fribourgeois (PDO)
- Switzerland – Gruyère cheese (PDO)
- Switzerland – Sbrinz (PDO)
- Switzerland – Walliser

== See also ==
- List of cheeses

== Literature ==
- Doane, C.F.; Hargrove, Robert C.; Lawson, H.W.; Matheson, K.J.; Sanders, G.P.; Walter, Homer E. (1969). Cheese Varieties and Descriptions. U.S. Department of Agriculture. p. 11.
- Brigitte Engelmann, Peter Holler: Gourmets Guide Cheese Ullmann Publishing (3 Sept. 2009). ISBN 978-3833150821.
