= Haymilk =

Dairy product

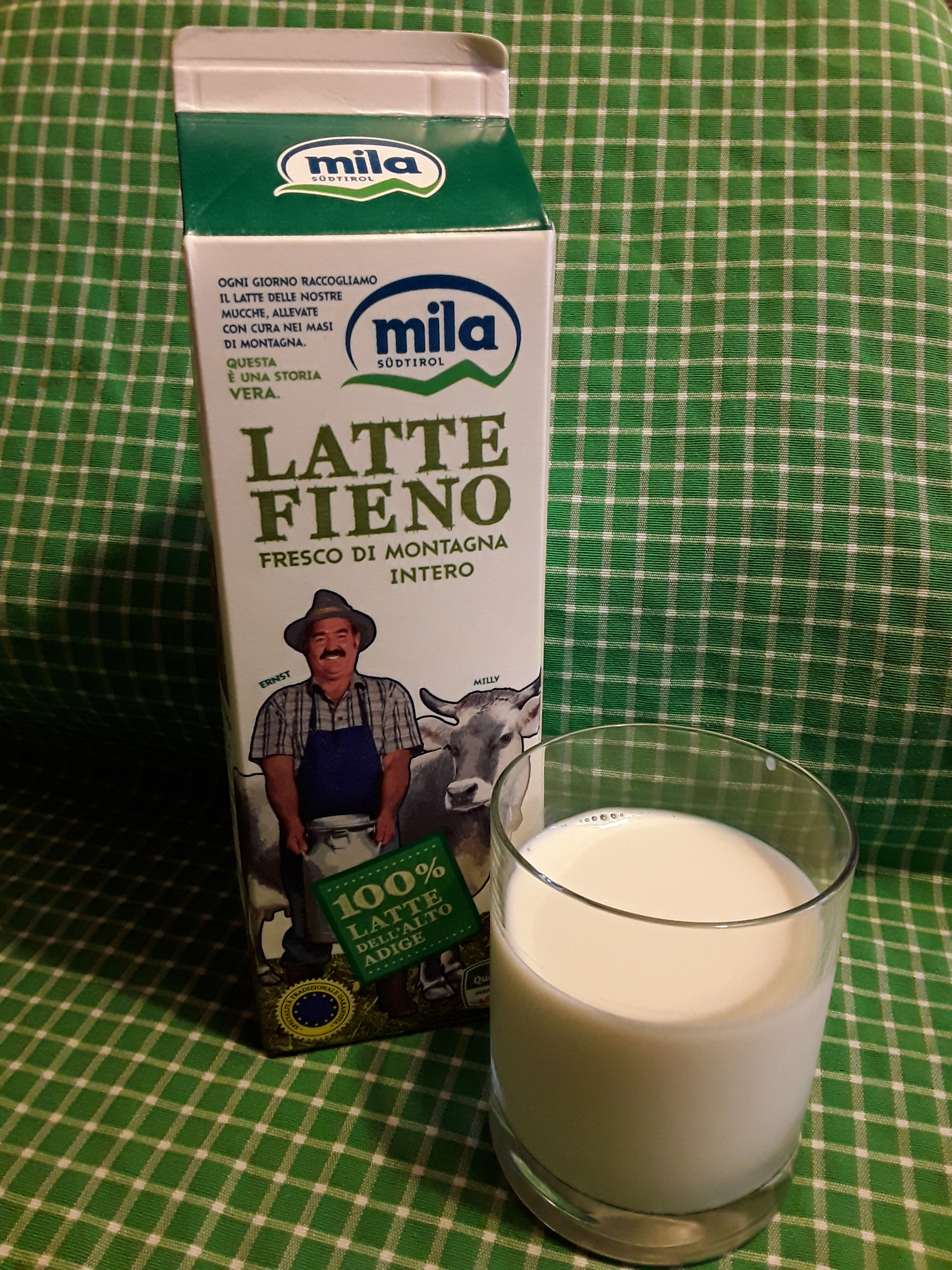
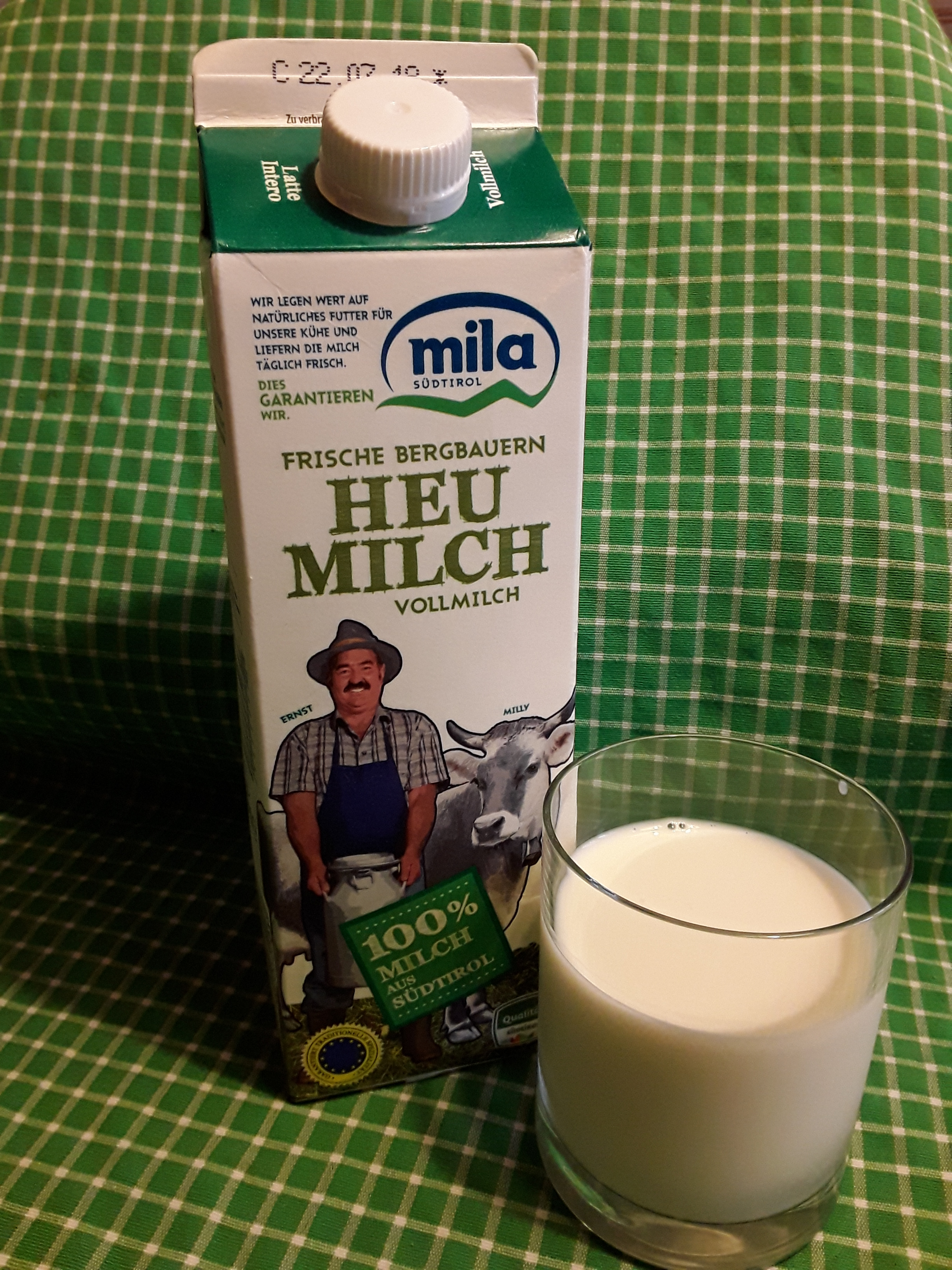
Haymilk in Italian (left) and German (right)

Haymilk (German: Heumilch; Italian: latte fieno) is a dairy milk produced from animals that have mainly been fed fresh grass and (dry) hay, rather than fermented fodder. The milk is thus produced according to the tradition in the Alps. The term haymilk is registered as a traditional speciality guaranteed in the UK and the European Union, and can only be used for milk produced corresponding to those specifications.

== Production ==
The milk can only be produced from animals that received mainly hay (winter) and "fresh grass, leguminous plants and foliage" in summer, but also roughage such as green rapeseed, green maize, green rye, and fodder beets is permitted. For a maximum of 25%, also cereal crops (wheat, oats, rye, etc.) and beans, field peas, lupins, and oleaginous fruits. Products such as fallen fruit, urea, and potatoes cannot be used as feed, and sewage sludge cannot be used as a fertilizer on the land.

== Traditional speciality guaranteed ==
Three different products were registered as a traditional speciality guaranteed, depending on the animal that is the source of the milk. In each case the name is registered in five languages, while a 2021 amendment request has been published to also include the name in Slovenian.

TSG products
| Animal | Date of Registration | Code | Name (English) | Name (German) | Name (Italian) | Name (French) | Name (Spanish) | Name (Slovenian) |
|---|---|---|---|---|---|---|---|---|
| Cow | 2016 | TSG-AT-1035 | Haymilk | Heumilch | Latte fieno | Lait de foin | Leche de heno | Seneno mleko |
| Sheep | 2019 | TSG-AT-2289 | Sheep's Haymilk | Schaf-Heumilch | Latte fieno di pecora | Lait de foin de brebis | Leche de heno de oveja | Ovčje seneno mleko |
| Goat | 2019 | TSG-AT-2290 | Goat's Haymilk | Ziegen-Heumilch | Latte fieno di capra | Lait de foin de chèvre | Leche de heno de cabra | Kozje seneno mleko |

== Use in cheese ==
Several cheeses must be made from haymilk; for example, the protected designation of origin cheeses Vorarlberger Bergkäse, Vorarlberger Alpkäse, Tiroler Bergkäse, and Tiroler Almkäse.

== See also ==
- Baked milk
- Condensed milk
- Evaporated milk
- Powdered milk
- Clotted cream
- Warm milk
