= Alpkäse =

Medium-hard Alpine cheeses

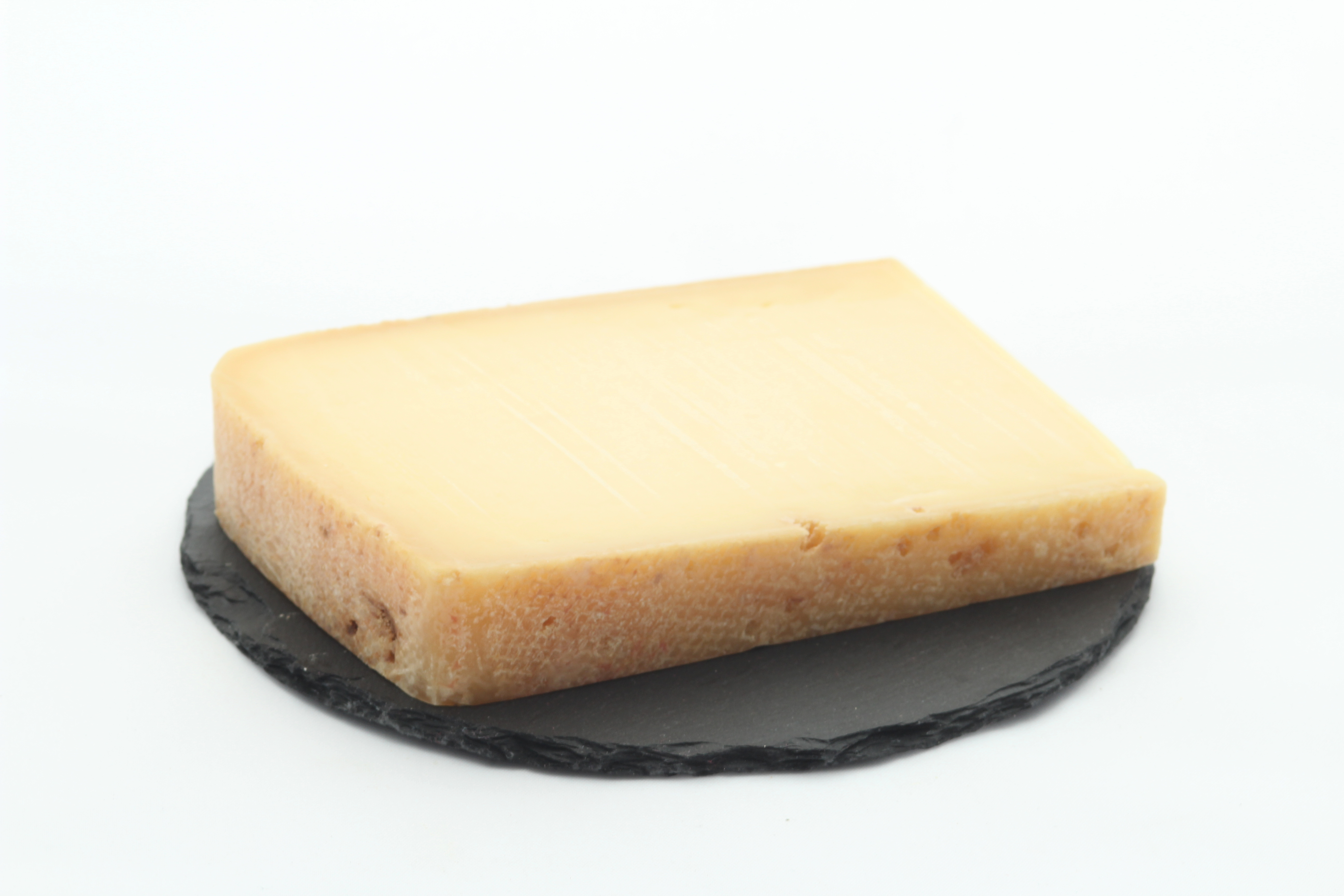
A slice of Alpkäse

Alpkäse (German: [ˈalpˌkɛːzə]) is a type of cheese made with cow's milk in the Alpine region (Austria, Italy, Switzerland, and Germany). It is classified as a Swiss-type or Alpine cheese. The first written mentions of the alpkäse cheese from Bern are from 1548.

Similar to the majority of hard/semi-hard cheese, the more it is matured, the more flavour it develops.

== Austria ==
In Austria, Alpkäse refers to a hard cheese that resembles Vorarlberger Bergkäse in taste and texture. The difference between these cheeses lies in the period and place of production. Bergkäse is produced in the low mountain range (between 600 and 1500 m) and year-round, so even in winter, when the animals are in the stables and fed with hay. Alpkäse, on the other hand, is produced only in the summer between May and September on high mountain meadows above 1500 m (Alpine pastures or alps), where the animals graze Alpine herbs. Therefore, Alpkäse is a seasonal product. An example of Austrian Alpkäse is the Vorarlberger Alpkäse or Tiroler Alpkäse both of which have been registered as PDO.

The production of Alpkäse is closely tied to the traditional farming practice of Alpine transhumance.

Tiroler Alpkäse, also called Tiroler Almkäse, has a hard rind and its name first appeared in 1544. Vorarlberger Alpkäse has a dry rind and a mild, slightly acidic flavor.

== See also ==
- List of Italian cheeses
- List of Austrian cheeses
- Swiss cheeses and dairy products
