= Sura Kees =

Austrian cheese

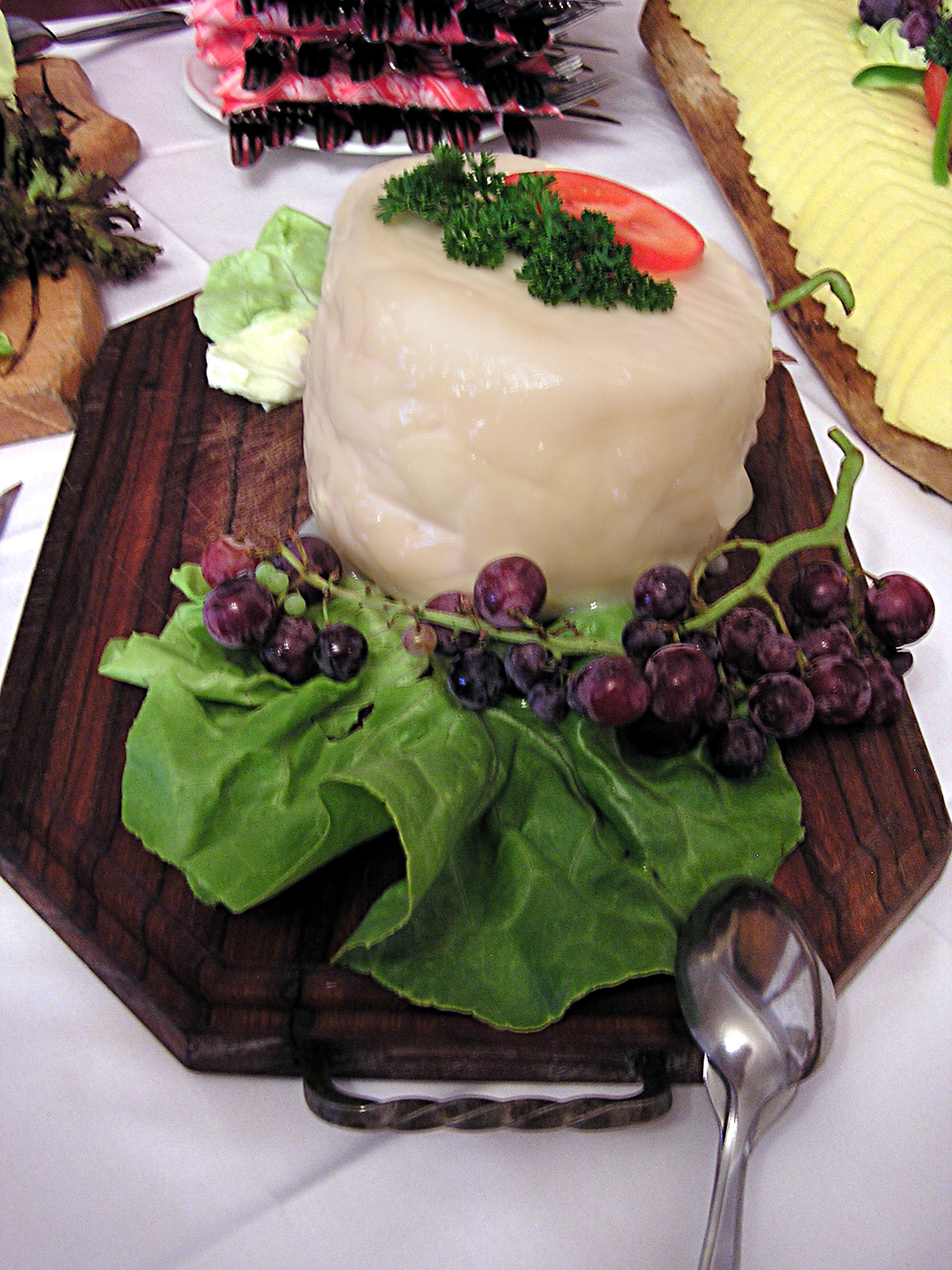
- Other names: Vorarlberger Sauerkäse, Montafoner Sauerkäse
- Country of origin: Austria
- Region: Montafon (Vorarlberg)
- Source of milk: Cows
- Texture: soft
- Fat content: low fat (1-10%)
- Weight: ½ kg or 2 kg
- Certification: PDO

Sura Kees (Alemannic for 'sour cheese'), also known as Vorarlberger Sauerkäse or Montafoner Sauerkäse, is a low-fat sour milk cheese originally from the Montafon valley in Vorarlberg (Austria). It is traditionally made from skim milk and is a by-product of butter production. Sura Kees resembles the Tyrolean grey cheese.

Sura Kees is usually served with vinegar, oil and onions, pure on black bread or eaten with potatoes.

== Production method ==
For the production of the traditional Montafoner Sura Kees, filtered milk is filled into "Brenten" (typical wooden vessels) to separate milk into cream and skim milk followed by a ripening period of one to two days. The cream is used for the production of butter, the skim milk is the raw material for sour cheese production.

The skimmed milk is acidified in the "Zuber" (wooden vat), filled into the "Kessi" (copper kettle) and heated to max. 40°C. The "Bolma" (cheese curd) is turned and filled with the "Bolmakelle" (ladle device) in the "Käsker" (special form), pressed by its own weight. It remains there until a solid mass is formed (about 24 hours). Then it is usually turned twice, so that the excess whey can drain. The mass is taken out of the mold, rubbed with salt (sometimes with paprika) and matured in the cellar. After about 3 weeks, the cheese rind is washed off, the cheese loaves are placed on wooden cheese racks and ripened in a further 4 to 6 weeks in the ripening room at 18 to 20°C. During this time, the "Muffna", the glassy, greasy bark of the sour cheese, grows thicker with age and gives the cheese its typical aroma. The loaves of sour milk cheese mature from outside to inside.

== History ==
The production of sour milk cheese has been known for around 7,000 years. By accident, the Sumerians discovered that leftover milk thickens and forms a solid mass with time. Thus, the first sour milk cheese was created. The knowledge of sour milk cheese production was spread by the Romans throughout Europe.

Cheese was made thousands of years ago by the Celts living in Vorarlberg, the pioneers of cheese-making in the Alpine region. The Celts brought the "cheese maker" to Vorarlberg. "Käsker" is the name given to the form in which the cheese mass is still squeezed out on the alpine pastures.

In the 17th century, sour milk cheese was displaced by rennet cheese production in many regions. Rennet cheese was better storable and transportable. This enabled trans-regional transport to the newly emerging cities. In the Montafon valley, however, the sour milk cheese dairy was preserved.

In the 1960s, more and more dairies had to close in the Montafon region. At that time, cheese production was concentrated on a few dairies in the valley. Due to a lack of traditional awareness and low regional marketing, there was a steady decline in local cheese specialties, including the Sura Kees.

It was not until the beginning of 1990 that there was a return and revival of historical values. The Sura Kees became more and more popular especially with the younger generations, farm shops emerged and the tourism industry and gastronomy discovered the sour cheese as an advertising medium. The Sura Kees recipe is one of the oldest in the German-speaking region. In 1997, the association "Montafon bewusst-er-leben" was founded to market regional agricultural products. In 2007, the club dealt with the re-marketing of Sura Kees.

== See also ==
- List of cheeses
- Website of Austria's culinary heritage (Sura Kees) (in German)
