= Tyrolean grey cheese =

Austrian quark

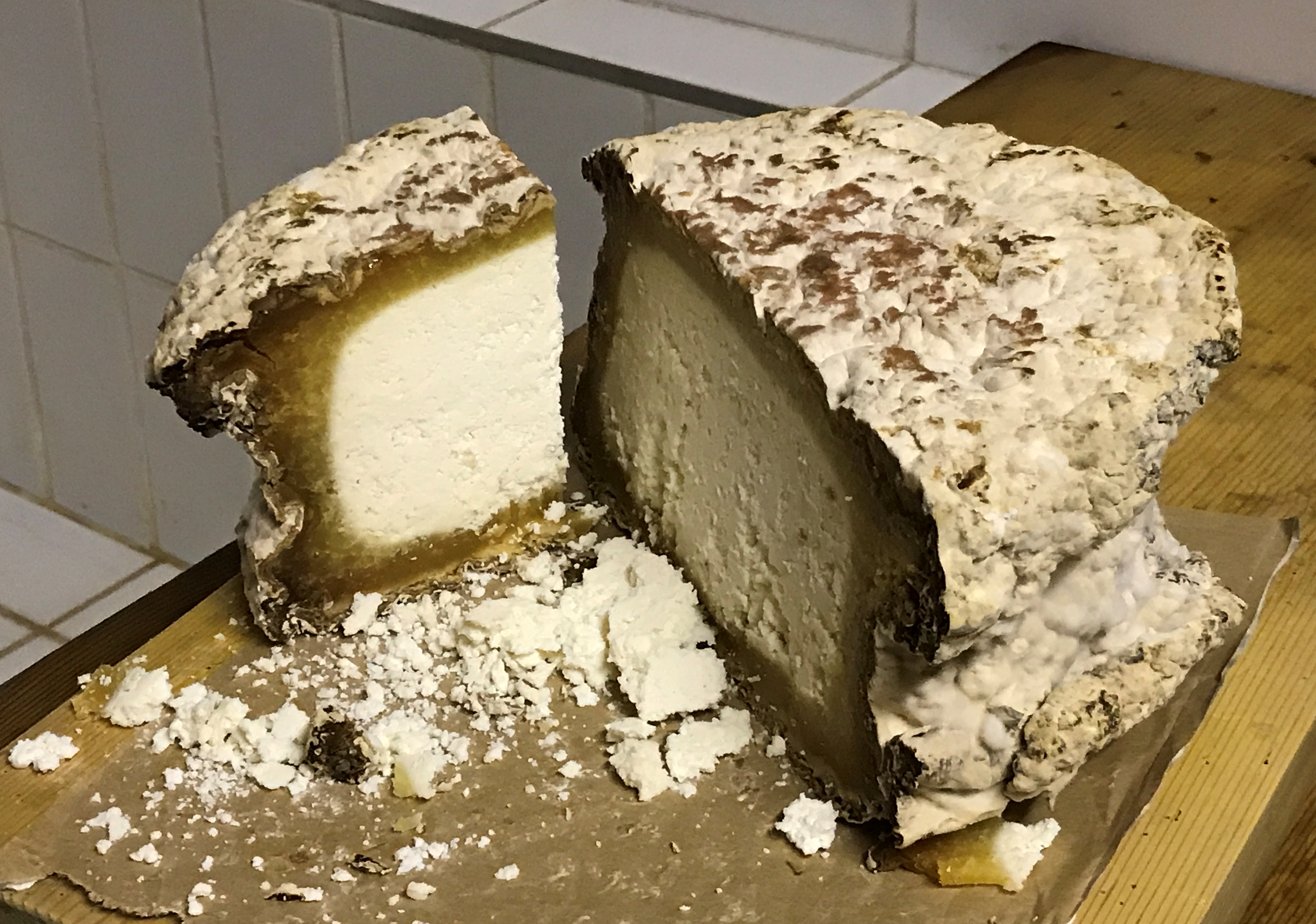
- Other names: Tiroler Graukäse
- Country of origin: Austria, Italy
- Region: Tyrol
- Source of milk: Cows
- Pasteurised: yes or no
- Fat content: low fat
- Weight: 1 to 4kg
- Certification: Tiroler Graukäse PDO, PAT

Tyrolean grey cheese (Tiroler Graukäse) is a strongly flavoured, rennet-free cows-milk acid-curd quark made in the Tyrolean Alp valleys, Austria. It owes its name to the grey mold that usually grows on its rind. It is extremely low in fat (around 0.5%) and has a powerful penetrating smell. The cheese produced in Austria is registered as protected designation of origin (PDO), Austria generally indicated in German as g.U. (geschützte Ursprungsbezeichnung) under the official name Tiroler Graukäse. The registration of the PDO states that its production has been a significant element of Tyrolean peasant gastronomy for centuries. Graukäse produced in Italy is protected by a prodotti agroalimentari tradizionali (PAT) designation. Graukäse making became widespread on farms due to the simplicity of making and the availability of low-fat milk after the fat had been taken for use in butter making.

== See also ==
- List of cheeses
