= Almabtrieb =

Annual event in Europe

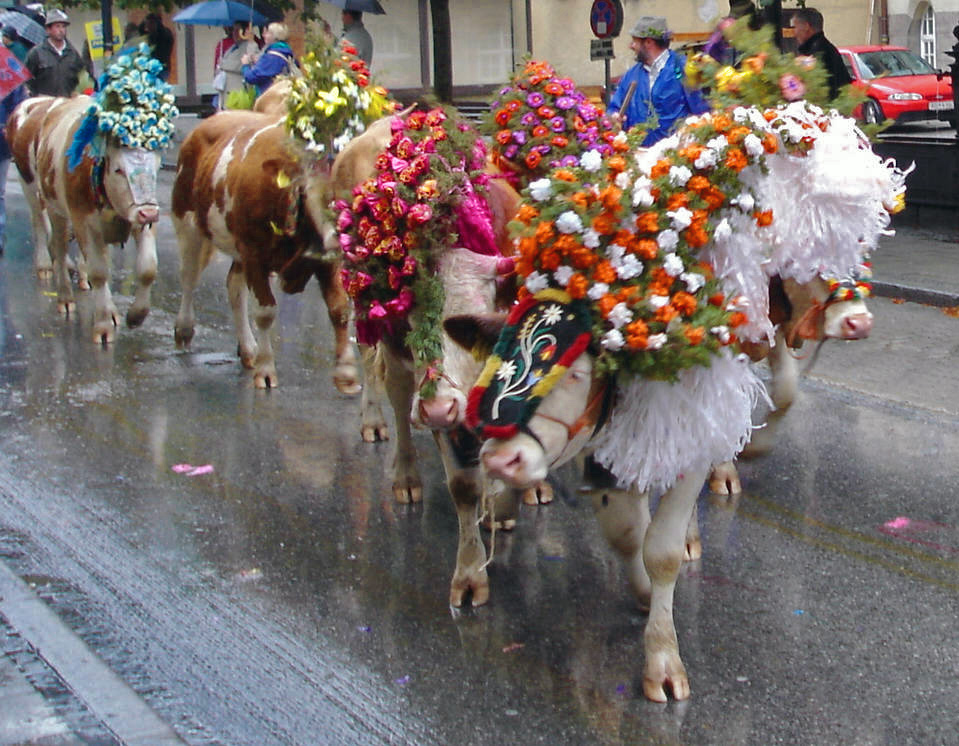
Almabtrieb in Kufstein, Austria

The Almabtrieb (from German, lit. 'drive downwards from the mountain pasture') is an annual cattle drive in the Alps in Europe, when cows are moved from high mountain pastures to quarters lower down to prepare for winter. It takes place in late September or early October every year.

In Switzerland it is also known as Alpabzug or Alpabfahrt in German-speaking areas and as désalpes where French is spoken.

== History ==
During summer, all over the alpine regions cattle herds feed on alpine pastures (Almen in Austria or Germany, Alpen in Switzerland) high up in the mountains, a practice known as transhumance. In numbers, these amount to about 500,000 in Austria, 380,000 in Switzerland, and 50,000 in Germany.

While there is often some movement of cattle between the Almen (sing.: Alm), or Alpen (sing.: Alp) respectively, during the summer, there is usually one concerted cattle drive in the autumn to bring the cattle to their barns down in the valley. If there were no accidents on the Alm during the summer, in many areas the cattle are decorated elaborately, and the cattle drive is celebrated with music, feasts and dance events in the towns and villages. Upon arrival in the valley, joint herds from multiple farmers are sorted in the Viehscheid, and each animal is returned to its owner.

In several places this Alpine custom of Almabtrieb has today evolved into a major tourist attraction, with a public festival and booths along the course selling agricultural and artisanal products.

In the spring, the reverse cattle drive moves from the valley barns to the Alp, known in Germany and Austria as Almauftrieb and in Switzerland as: Alpaufzug, Alpfahrt, or Alpauffahrt. This is only normally celebrated in Switzerland. One of the first films produced in Switzerland in 1896 showed an Alpaufzug.

Similar events, but with sheep instead of cattle, are redyk in Poland and the Trailing of the Sheep in Idaho.

== See also ==
- Trailing of the sheep, an equivalent in Idaho
- Transhumance
- Yaylag
