= Ruscher =

Ruscher or Rüscher is a German surname. Notable people with this surname include:

- Hans-Joachim Rüscher (1928–2015), East German politician (SED)
- Martina Rüscher (born 1972), Austrian politician (ÖVP)
- Thomas Ruscher (1449–1510), former Auxiliary Bishop of Mainz
