= Norbert Pallua =

German surgeon (born 1952)

Norbert Pallua (born 21 January 1952 in Bruneck, Alto Adige) is a surgeon noted for contributions to plastic surgery, including facial reconstruction using flaps, regeneration, and burn rehabilitation.

== Works ==
He treated Sergei Filin for facial burns after the latter's acid attack. He was head of the Department of Plastic Surgery, Hand and Burns Surgery at the Uniklinikum Aachen until July 2017.
