= Bruneck =

- Comune
- Stadtgemeinde Bruneck; Città di Brunico
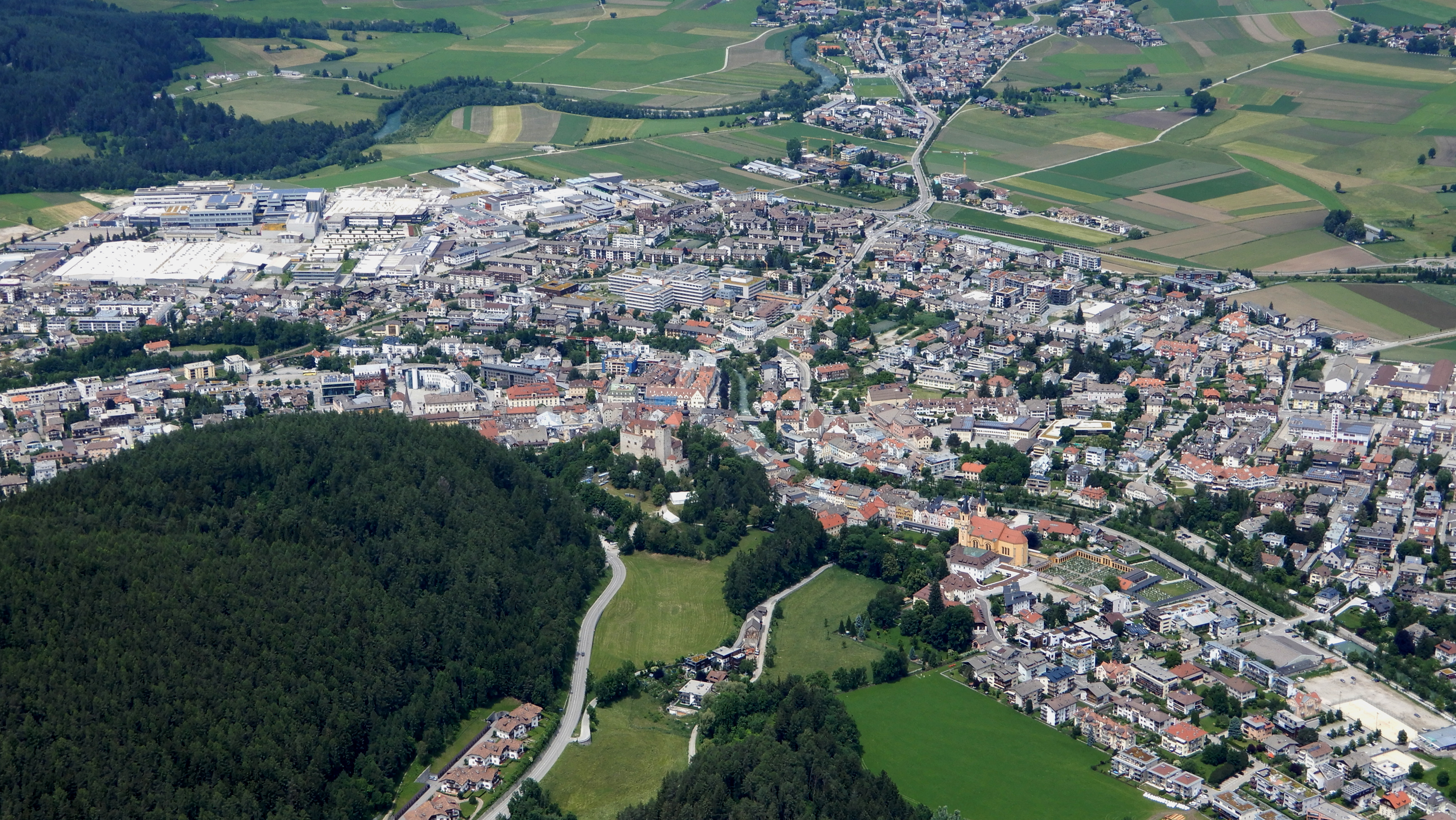
- June 2018 view over Bruneck

- Coat of arms

- Location within Italy Location within Trentino-Alto Adige/Südtirol
- Coordinates: 46°47′47″N 11°56′17″E
- Country: Italy
- Region: Trentino-Alto Adige/Südtirol
- Province: South Tyrol (BZ)
- Frazioni: Aufhofen (Villa Santa Caterina), Dietenheim (Teodone), Luns (Lunes), Reischach (Riscone), Stegen (Stegona), St. Georgen (San Giorgio)

Government
  - Mayor: Bruno Wolf (SVP)

Area
  - Total: 45 km^{2} (17 sq mi)
- Elevation: 838 m (2,749 ft)

Population (31 December 2025)
  - Total: 17,178
  - Density: 380/km^{2} (990/sq mi)
- Demonym(s): German: Brunecker; Italian: brunicensi
- Time zone: UTC+1 (CET)
  - Summer (DST): UTC+2 (CEST)
- Postal code: 39031
- Dialing code: 0474
- Website: Official website

Bruneck (Austrian German: [ˈbrʊnɛk]; Italian: Brunico, pronounced [bruˈniːko] or [ˈbruːniko]; Ladin: Bornech [borˈnek] or Burnech [burˈnek]; Latin: Brunecium or Brunopolis) is the largest city in the Puster Valley in the Italian province of South Tyrol.

== Geography ==
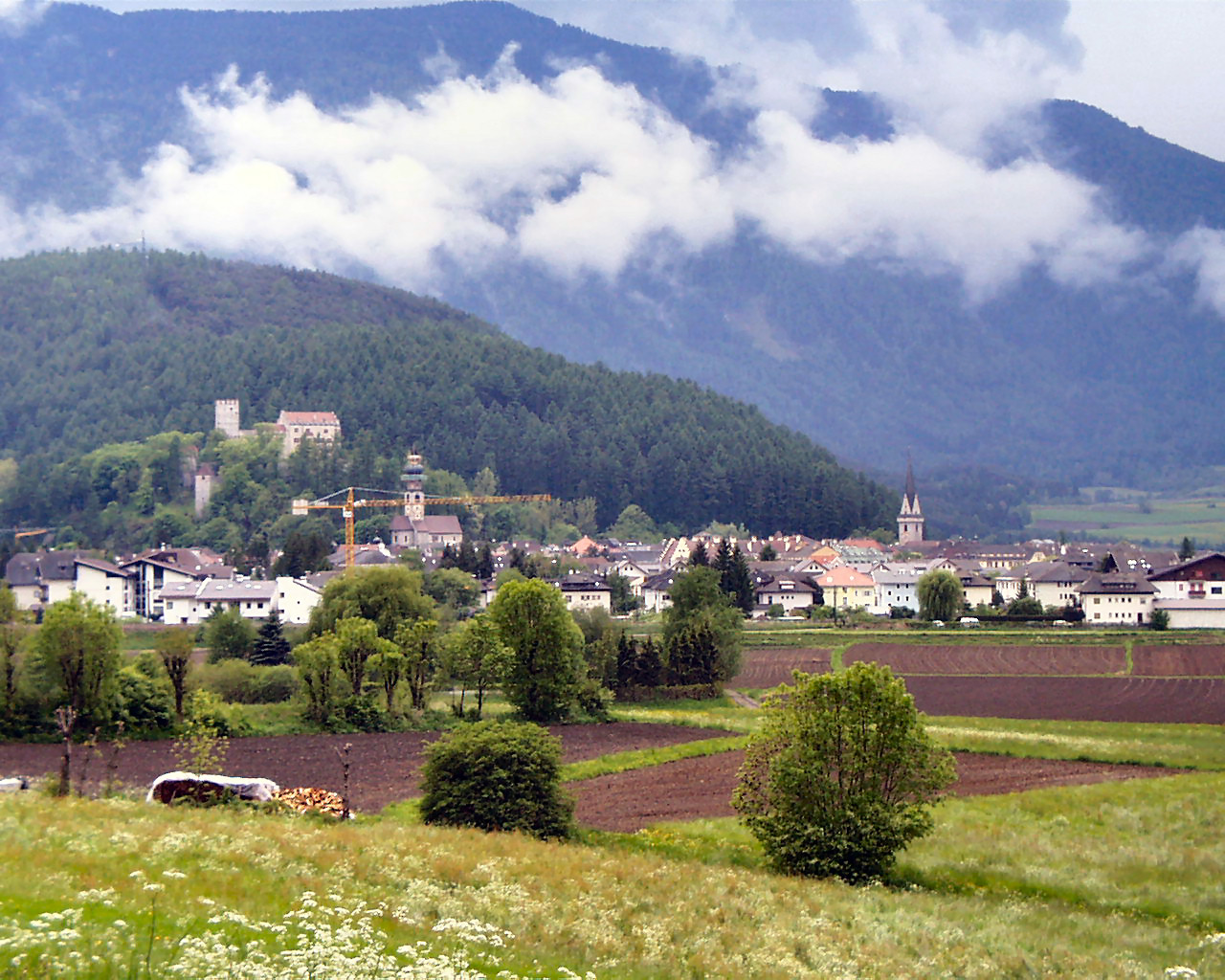
View of Bruneck Castle and old town

Bruneck rises up in the middle of a wide valley (perhaps an ancient lake basin) and lies at the confluence of the Ahr with the Rienz, which itself flows into the Eisack river. Here the northern Tauferer Ahrntal side valley and the southern Val Badia of the Gran Ega creek join the broad Pustertal. Bruneck wide valley, located between the two straits of Kiens downstream and Percha upstream, delimited to the South by the circular elevation of Kronplatz and opened to the North in the Tauferer Tal (Val di Tures), owes its conformation and extent to the action of glaciers and, subsequently, to the erosive action of the waters. The municipal area stretches from the slopes of the Zillertal Alps in the west to the Rieserferner Group of the High Tauern range in the east. In the south rises the Kronplatz massif, part of the Dolomites, the Bruneck Hausberg with the Messner Mountain Museum Corones building designed by Zaha Hadid on top at an elevation of 2,275 metres (7,464 ft) and a popular ski area.

The Bruneck town centre is located about 35 kilometres (22 mi) east of Brixen and 70 kilometres (43 mi) of the regional capital Bolzano. To the east, the town is 40 kilometres (25 mi) from Winnebach (part of Innichen) on the border with East Tyrol in Austria.

=== Linguistic distribution ===
According to the 2024 census, 78.71% of the population speak German, 19.31% Italian and 1.98% Ladin as first language.

== History ==
The wide valley where today the city of Bruneck rises up was initially uninhabited until it was occupied by the Romans; the local populations, because of the danger of flooding of the river Rienz, used to live on the sides of the valley or in the neighbouring hills. The valley floor was soon to be populated since the Puster Valley was the main arterial road used to connect Northern Italy to the Danube area of Europe. In 1091, following the passage of the Pustrissa countship from Henry IV to the Bishop of Brixen Altvino, the episcopal administration was established in the village of St. Caterina. Nearby the small village of Ragen rose up as well as some farmsteads, which, after a donation from the noblewoman Svainilde, around 1000, became part of the possessions of the Brixen bishops.

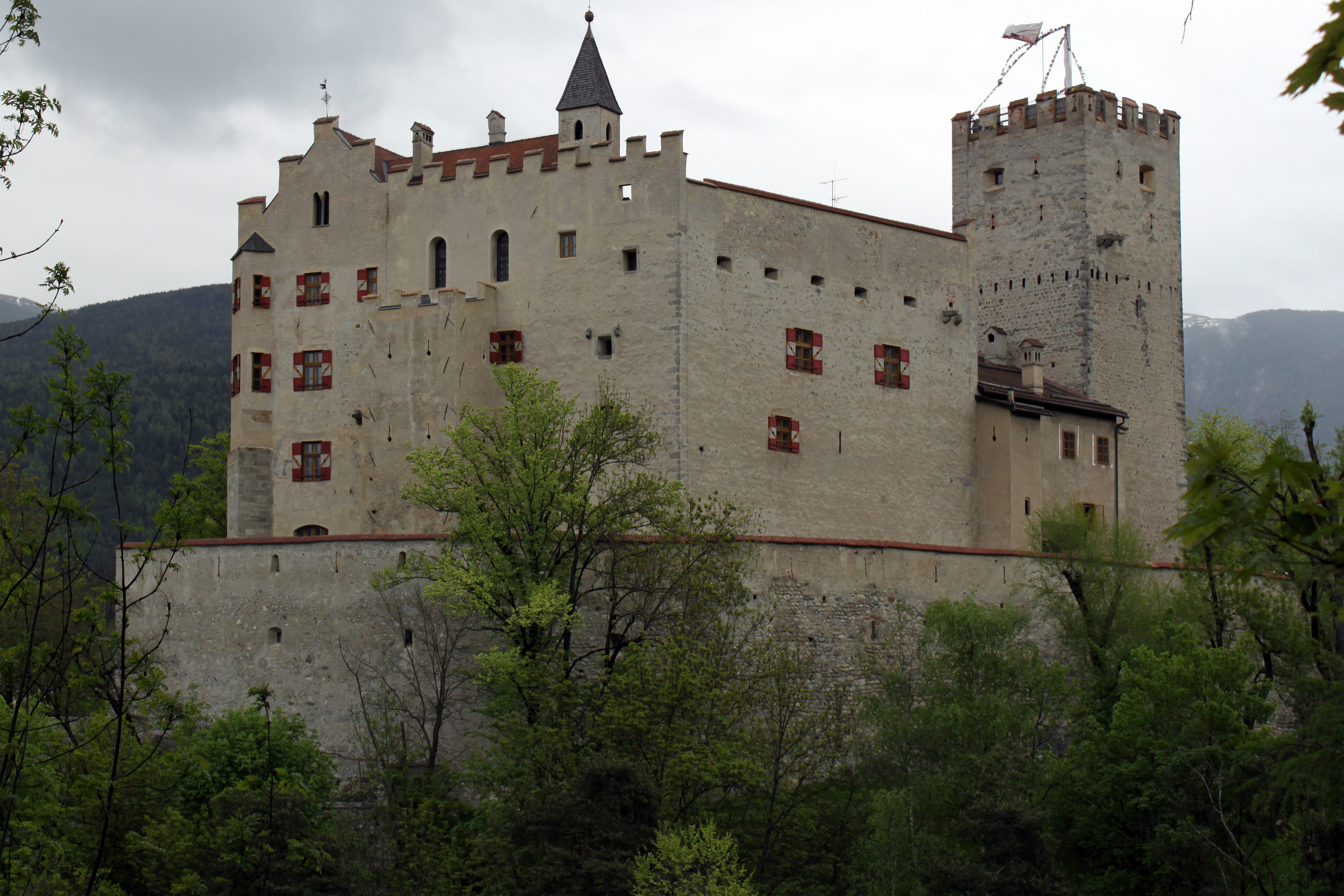
Bruneck Castle

The town was probably named after its founder, the Brixen prince-bishop Bruno von Kirchberg, and first appeared as Bruneke in a deed issued on 23 February 1256. At that time, the town consisted of two rows of houses forming a narrow lane. During the turbulent times of the interregnum upon the death of the Hohenstaufen emperor Frederick II in 1250, the prince-bishop had a fortress erected above the town, which was first mentioned in 1276. The castle was significantly enlarged under Prince-Bishop Albert von Enn, who also had the town walls and moat completed until 1336.

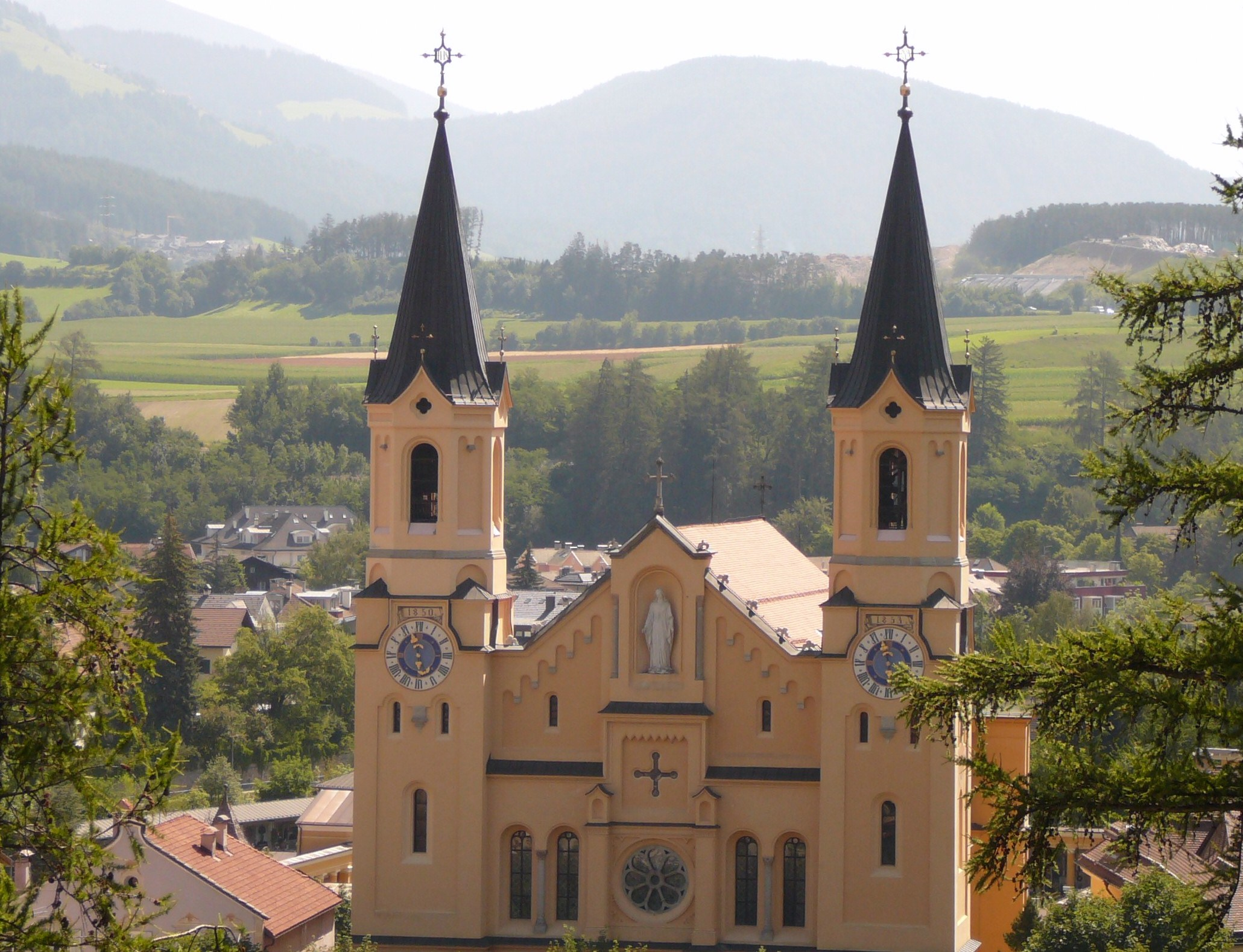
Church of the Assumption of Mary

Soon thereafter, further rows of houses were built outside the eastern gate. These led to the small Church of Our Lady (today's Church of the Assumption of Mary). The first church inside the town walls (at first only a small chapel) was built beneath the castle by the Brunecker burgher Niklas von Stuck. This church is today the Rainkirche. In 1358, Heinrich von Stuck, brother of Niklas, brother, funded the hospital/almshouse that was built in the following years. Soon the town received the right to hold a weekly market and impose high justice. A castle leader occupied the fortress as the bishop's representative.

In the 14th and 15th centuries, there was brisk trade between Augsburg and Venice. Some of the traded goods were brought through the Puster Valley and often stored long-term in Bruneck on the Ballplatz. This soon brought the town prosperity and fame. In this time, the Puster Valley painting school was founded by the painter Hans von Bruneck and others. The great masters Michael and Friedrich Pacher studied at this school. In 1500, the Puster Valley was reunited with Tyrol because of a testamentary contract between the house of Habsburg and the counts of Görz. The town of Bruneck remained an episcopal possession.

In 1610, Bruneck, which had previously belonged to the parish of St. Lorenzen, became a parish in its own right. The first parish priest documented was Johann Herlin in 1613. In 1626, the Capuchin order came to Bruneck. The Fathers built themselves a monastery at the "Spitalangerle", which still exists today. On 11 April 1723, the worst fire in the town's history occurred. In 1741, a convent was built by the Ursulines. In Oberragen, not far from the church, a fire broke out, which soon spread by the strong east wind across a large part of the town, mostly destroying it. During the long-lasting Napoleonic Wars the town suffered no material damage, but as a marching station went into great debt because of housing and feeding soldiers and infantrymen for many years.

After World War I, South Tyrol and so also Bruneck became part of the Italian State, getting the Italian name. The city was spared damage in World War I, but in World War II the town was bombed, leading to loss of both life and property.

=== Coat of arms ===
The emblem is a tower with a sloping roof, on an embattled wall with the silver gate lifted. The gules tower and the wall are placed on a vert hill with three peaks: the castle was built by Bishop Bruno von Kirchberg in the second half of the 13th century. The castle appeared on the coat of arms for the first time in the second half of the 15th century. The emblem was adopted in 1931.

== Climate ==
Due to its high elevation, with a mean height of around 830 metres above sea level, the town of Bruneck has a warm-summer humid continental climate (Köppen: "Dfb"), with warm summers and chilly winters in Italian standards. Its alpine geography heavily contributes to its weather, as it brings large diurnal temperature variations.

Climate data for Brunico, Italy
| Month | Jan | Feb | Mar | Apr | May | Jun | Jul | Aug | Sep | Oct | Nov | Dec | Year |
|---|---|---|---|---|---|---|---|---|---|---|---|---|---|
| Mean daily maximum °C (°F) | 1.3 (34.3) | 4.1 (39.4) | 9 (48) | 13.8 (56.8) | 18.2 (64.8) | 21.8 (71.2) | 24.1 (75.4) | 22.7 (72.9) | 20.2 (68.4) | 13.6 (56.5) | 7 (45) | 2.6 (36.7) | 13.2 (55.8) |
| Daily mean °C (°F) | −3.2 (26.2) | −1.0 (30.2) | 3.5 (38.3) | 7.9 (46.2) | 12.1 (53.8) | 15.5 (59.9) | 17.5 (63.5) | 16.6 (61.9) | 14.1 (57.4) | 8.3 (46.9) | 2.8 (37.0) | −1.5 (29.3) | 7.7 (45.9) |
| Mean daily minimum °C (°F) | −7.8 (18.0) | −6.2 (20.8) | −2.0 (28.4) | 2.1 (35.8) | 6.1 (43.0) | 9.3 (48.7) | 11.0 (51.8) | 10.6 (51.1) | 8.0 (46.4) | 3.0 (37.4) | −1.3 (29.7) | −5.5 (22.1) | 2.3 (36.1) |
| Average precipitation mm (inches) | 129.4 (5.09) | 174.7 (6.88) | 191.3 (7.53) | 52.9 (2.08) | 64.8 (2.55) | 102.1 (4.02) | 131.7 (5.19) | 100.0 (3.94) | 72.3 (2.85) | 69.9 (2.75) | 57.6 (2.27) | 125.9 (4.96) | 1,272.6 (50.11) |
| Average precipitation days | 6 | 6 | 8 | 11 | 13 | 16 | 14 | 14 | 10 | 9 | 8 | 7 | 122 |
Source: World Weather Online

== Economy ==
After the war, industrial zones, workshops, and department stores were built, permitting the town considerable economic and geographic growth. In the 1960s, tourism was especially important to the town, resulting in the building of numerous new hotels and guest houses.

Bruneck is characterized by the manufacturing and service industries. Important tourist centers are found all around Bruneck. Especially worthy of mention is the ski resort on Kronplatz mountain. As of 22 October 2001, the day of the Italian population and employment census, Bruneck had 10,692 employed people in 1,678 workplaces, making it the second-largest employer of the province. It lay only just after Brixen (Bressanone), which on census day employed 239 fewer people. Five companies in the town employ more than 250 people each, and five more companies employ more than 100 people each.

=== Tourism ===
All year round many famous markets and festivals take place here. For example, the popular Stegener Market at the end of October, the largest market in Tyrol.

== International relations ==
=== Twin towns – Sister cities ===
Bruneck is twinned with:

| Brignoles, France; Groß-Gerau, Germany | Tielt, Belgium; Szamotuły, Poland |

== Sports ==
The locality is home to HC Pustertal Wölfe, a professional ice hockey team currently playing in the ICE Hockey League.

== Notable people ==
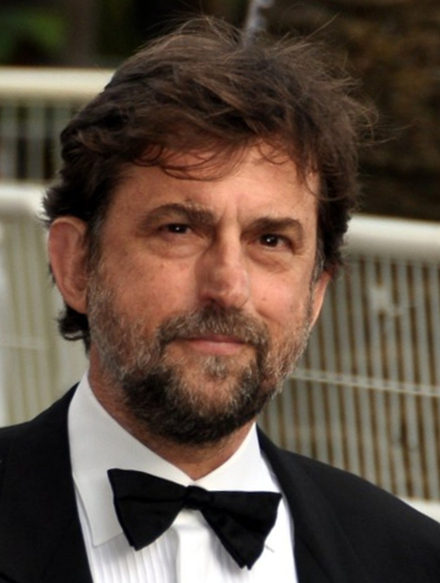
Nanni Moretti (2011)

- Michael Pacher (c. 1435–1498) a painter and sculptor
- Albert Knoll (1796–1863) an Austrian Capuchin dogmatic theologian.
- Alfred Amonn (1883–1962) economist
- Jiří Potůček (1919–1942) member of the Resistance in German-occupied Czechoslovakia, born to Czech parents in Bruneck, who soon moved back to Bohemia
- Karl Baumgartner (1949–2014) film producer
- Norbert Pallua (born 1952) plastic surgeon
- Greti Schmid (born 1954) former Austrian politician
- Nanni Moretti (born 1953) film director, producer, screenwriter and actor
- Markus Lanz (born 1969) TV presenter and producer in Germany

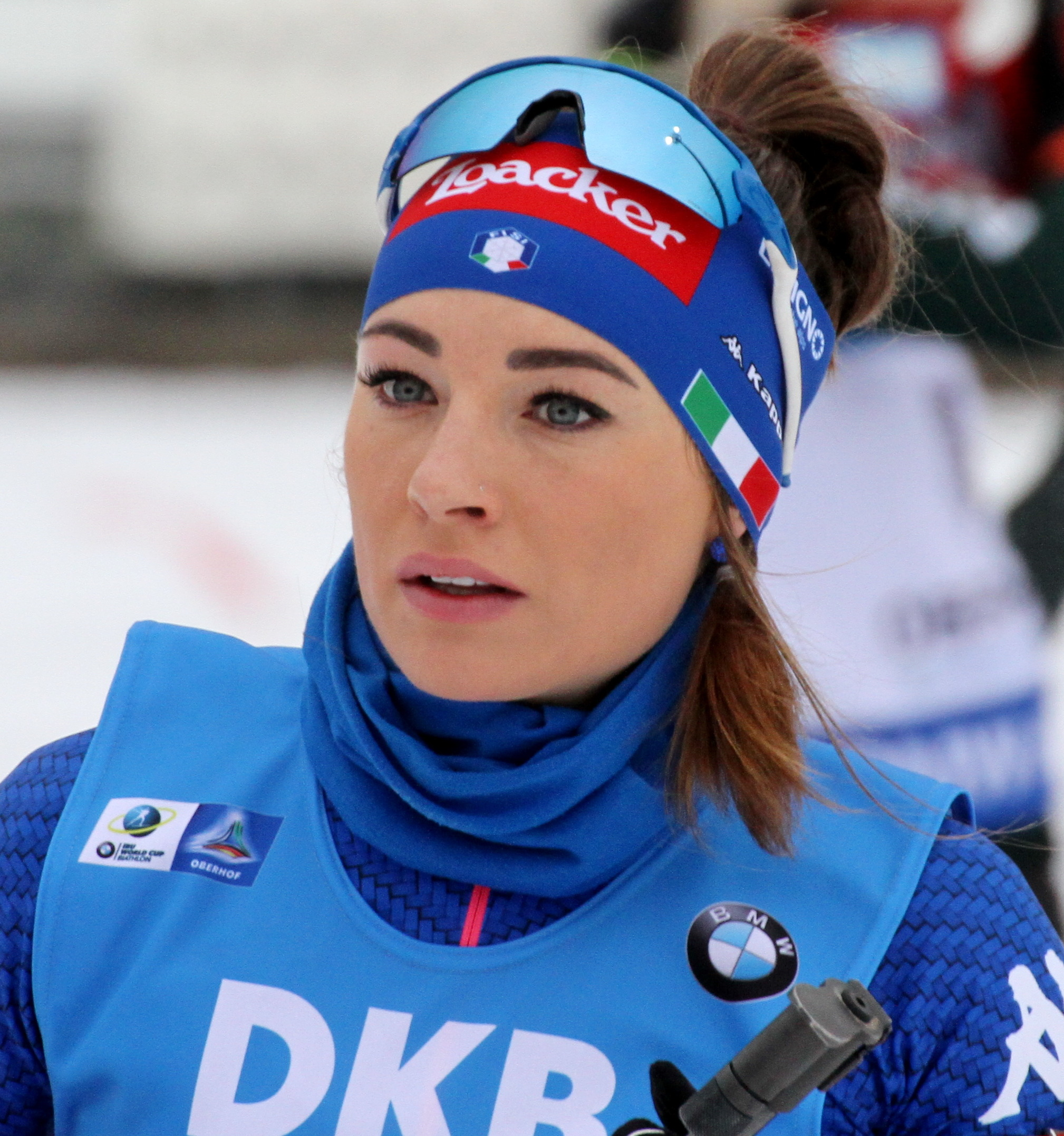
Dorothea Wierer (2018)

Sport

- Norbert Huber (born 1964) luger, competed in four Winter Olympics, won silver in 1994 and bronze in 1992
- Kurt Brugger (born 1969) luger and coach; gold medallist at the 1994 Winter Olympics, competed in four Winter Olympics
- Dagmar Mair unter der Eggen (born 1974) snowboarder, competed at the 1998 Winter Olympics
- Manfred Reichegger (born 1977) ski mountaineer, sky runner and mountain runner
- Christof Innerhofer (born 1984) World Cup alpine ski racer, world champion in super-G
- Karin Knapp (born 1987) retired tennis player
- Dominik Windisch (born 1989) biathlete, bronze medallist in the 2014 and 2018 Winter Olympics
- Lukas Hofer (born 1989) biathlete, bronze medallist in the 2014 and 2018 Winter Olympics
- Dorothea Wierer (born 1990) biathlete, bronze medallist at the 2014 Winter Olympics

== Gallery ==
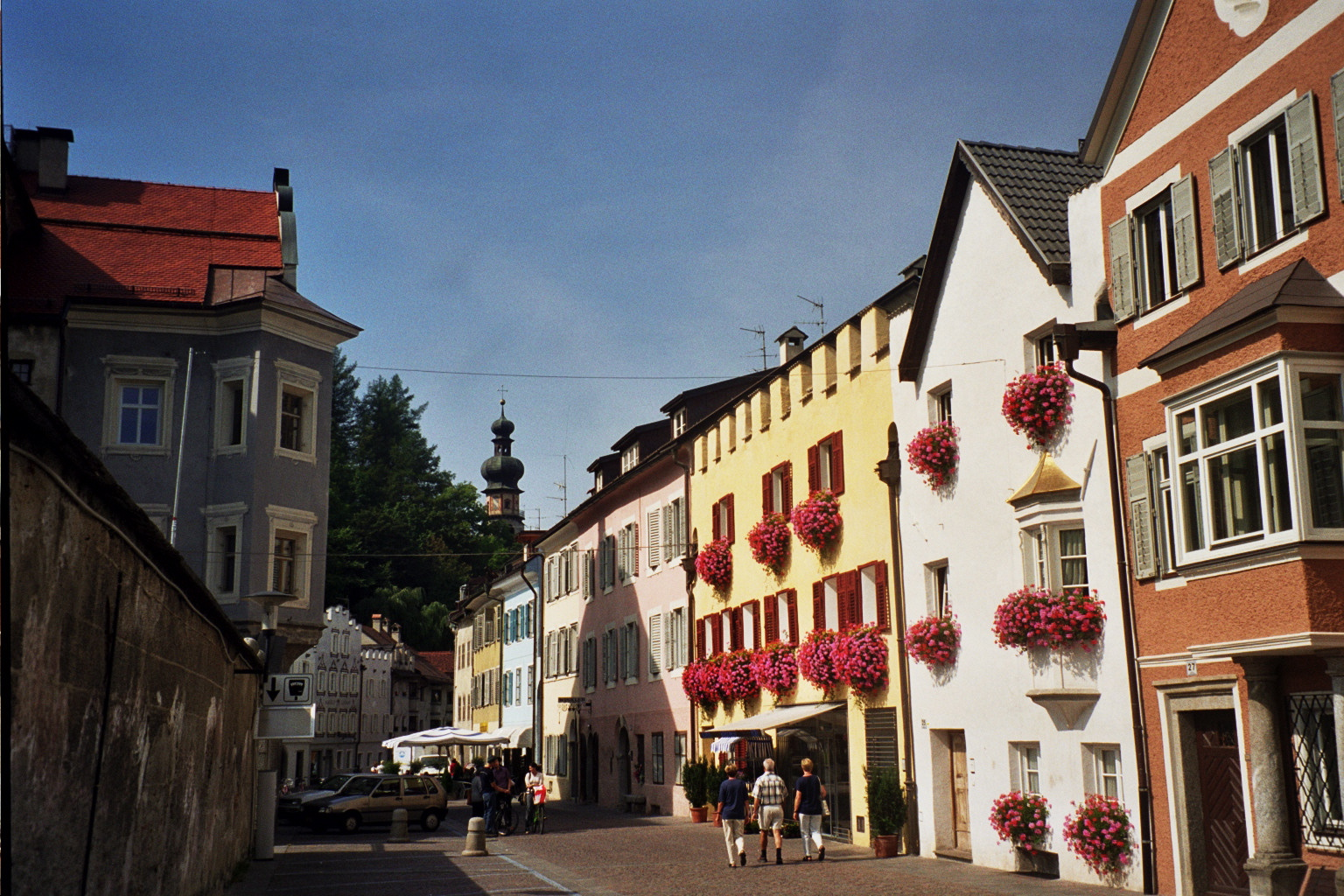
Stadtgasse/Via Centrale - pedestrian area

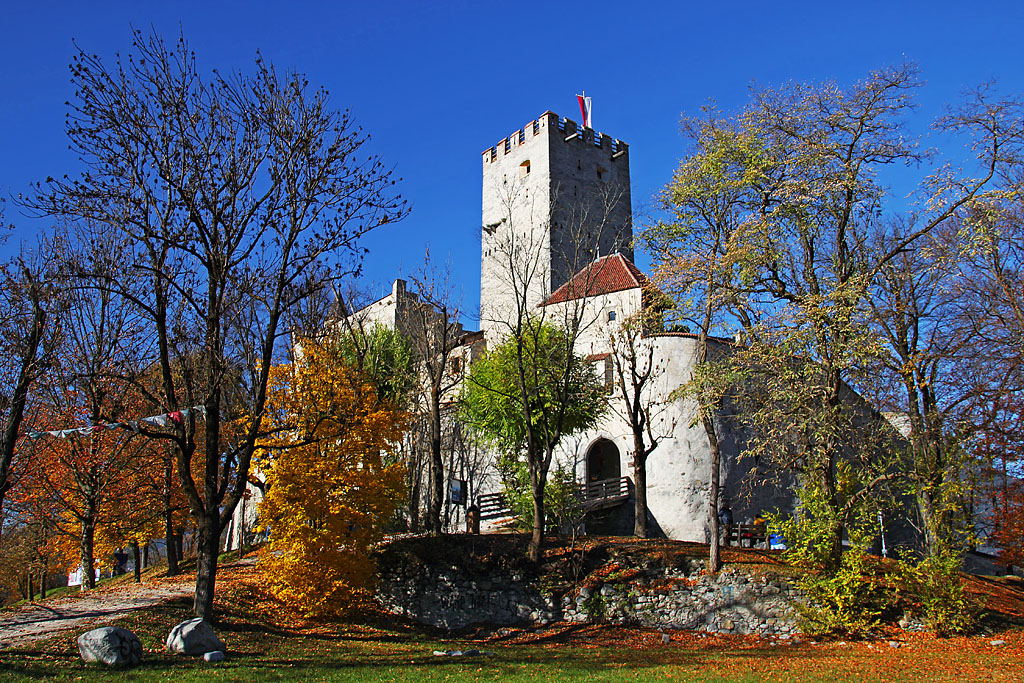
Bruneck castle

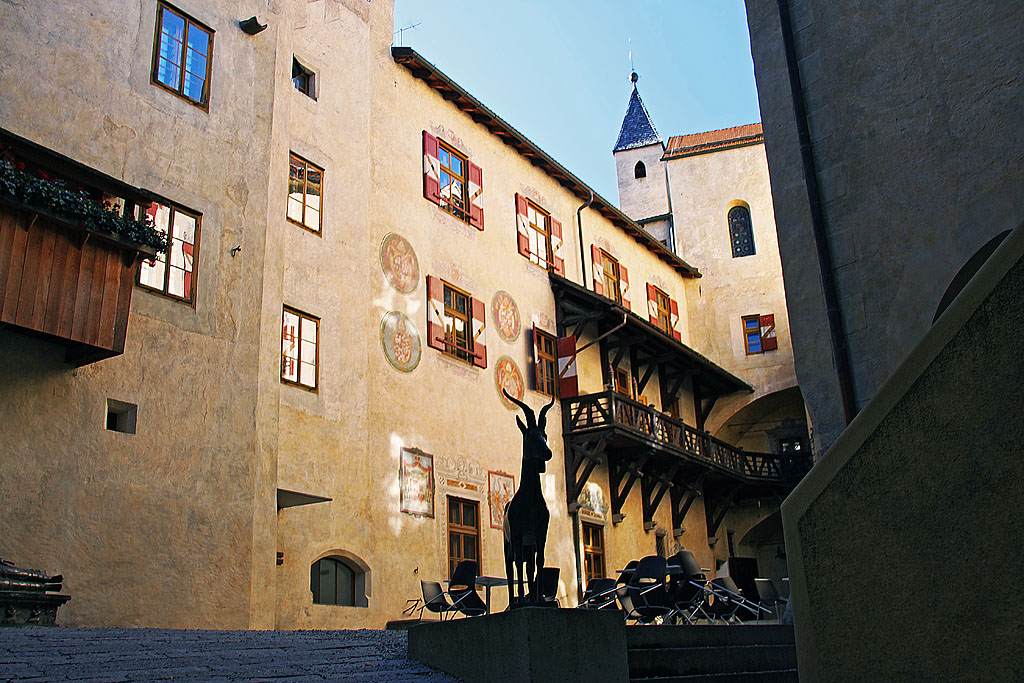
Bruneck castle – courtyard

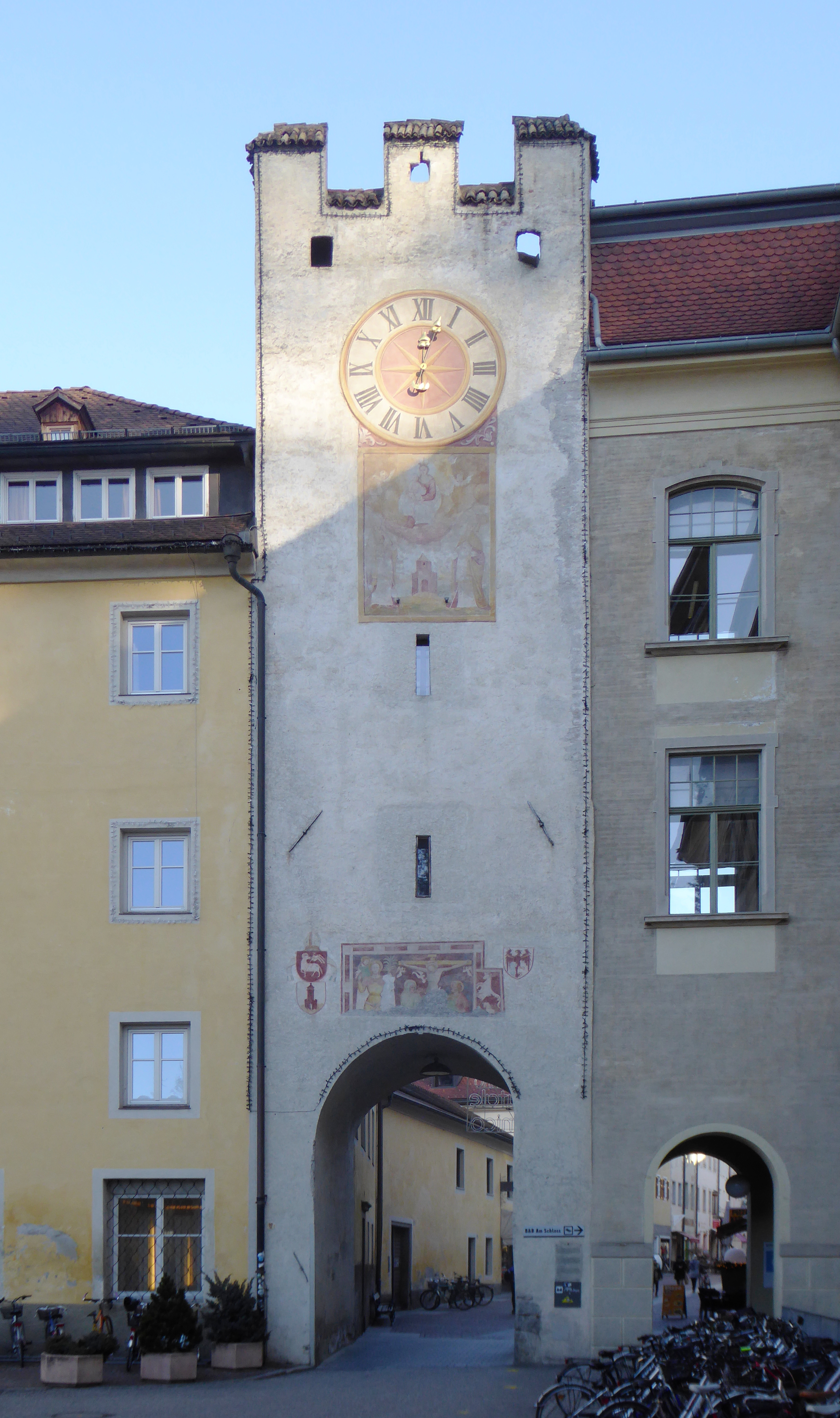
Ursulinen-Gate seen from southwest

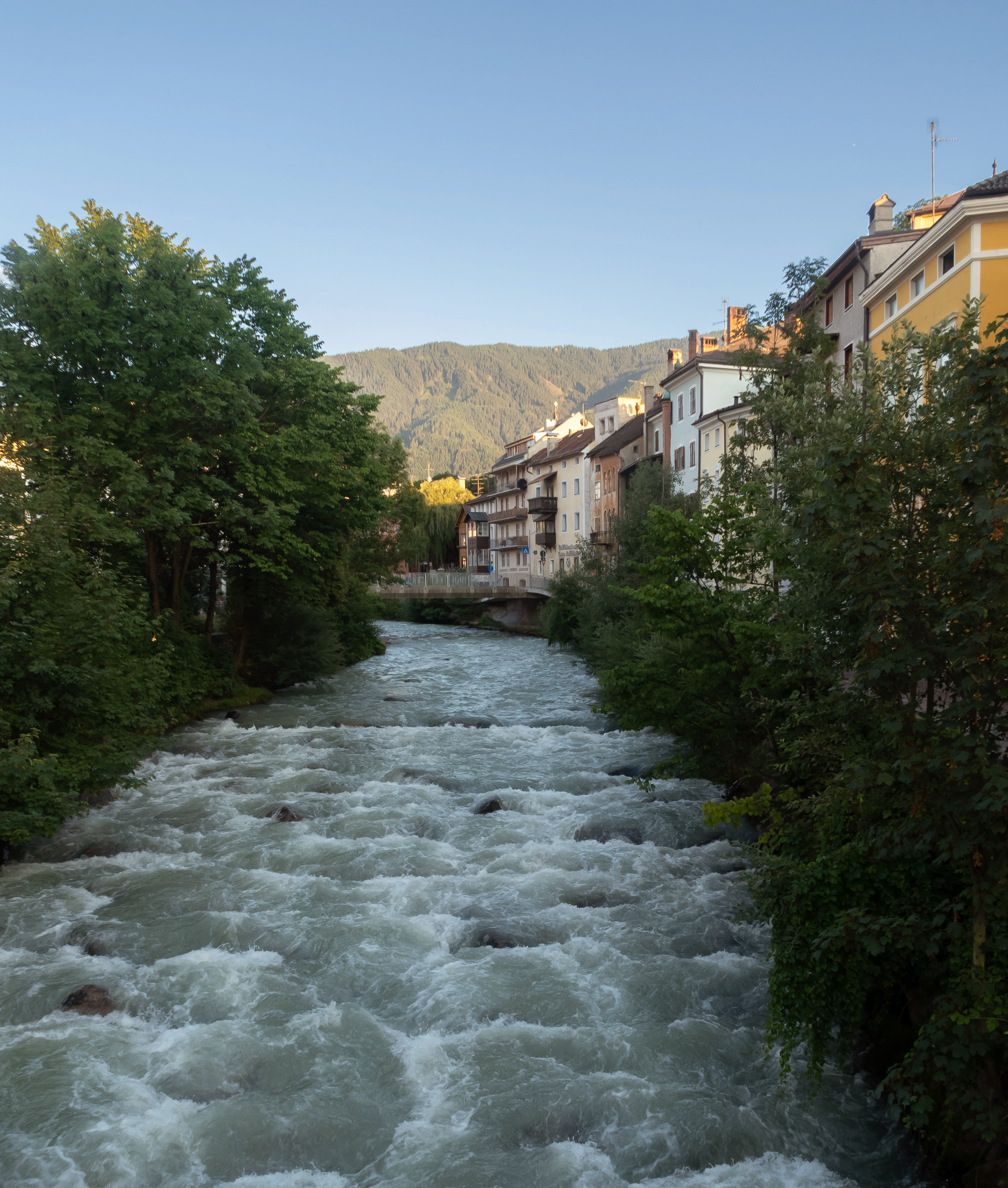
The river Rienz

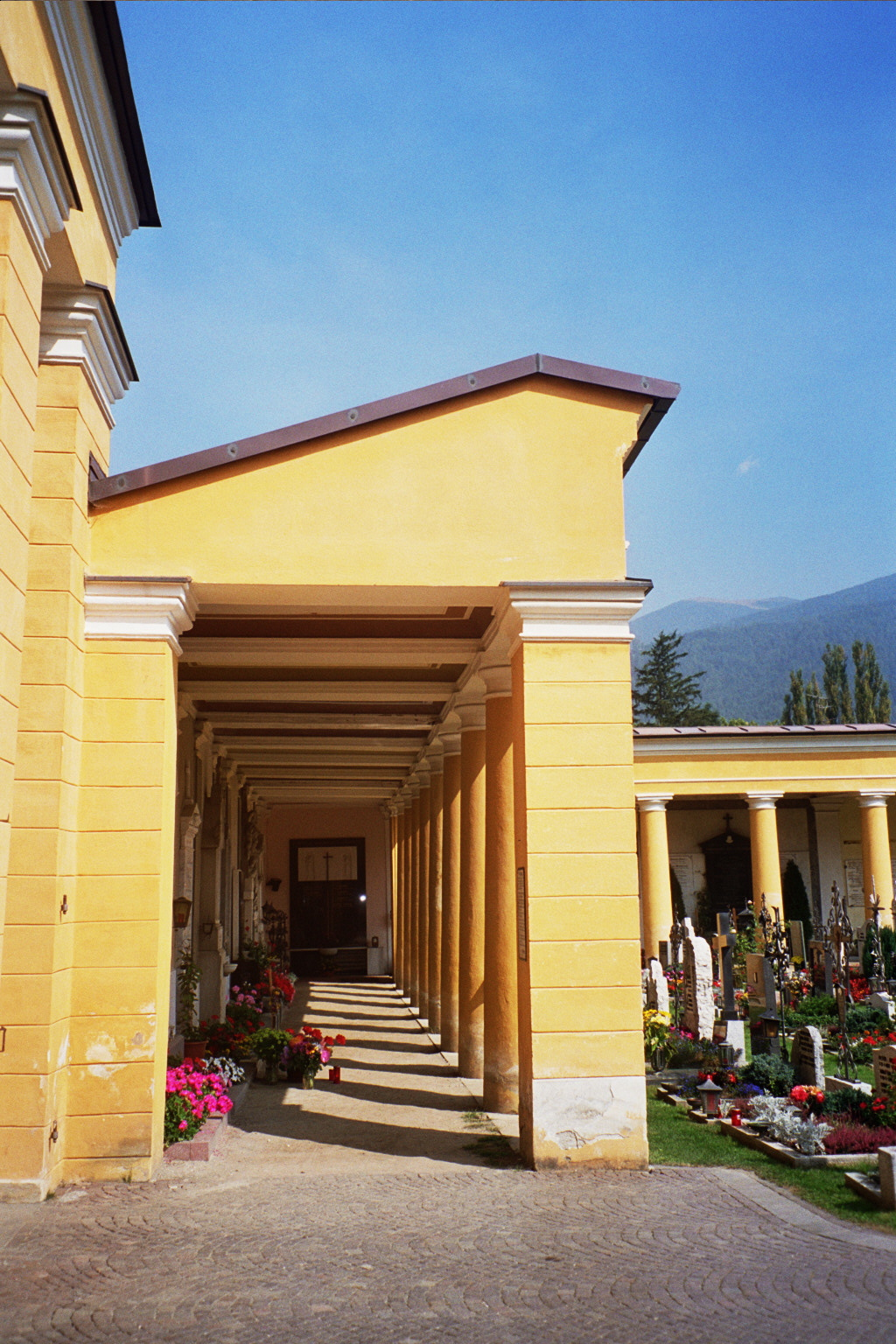
Bruneck Cemetery
