= Andelsbuch =

- Municipality
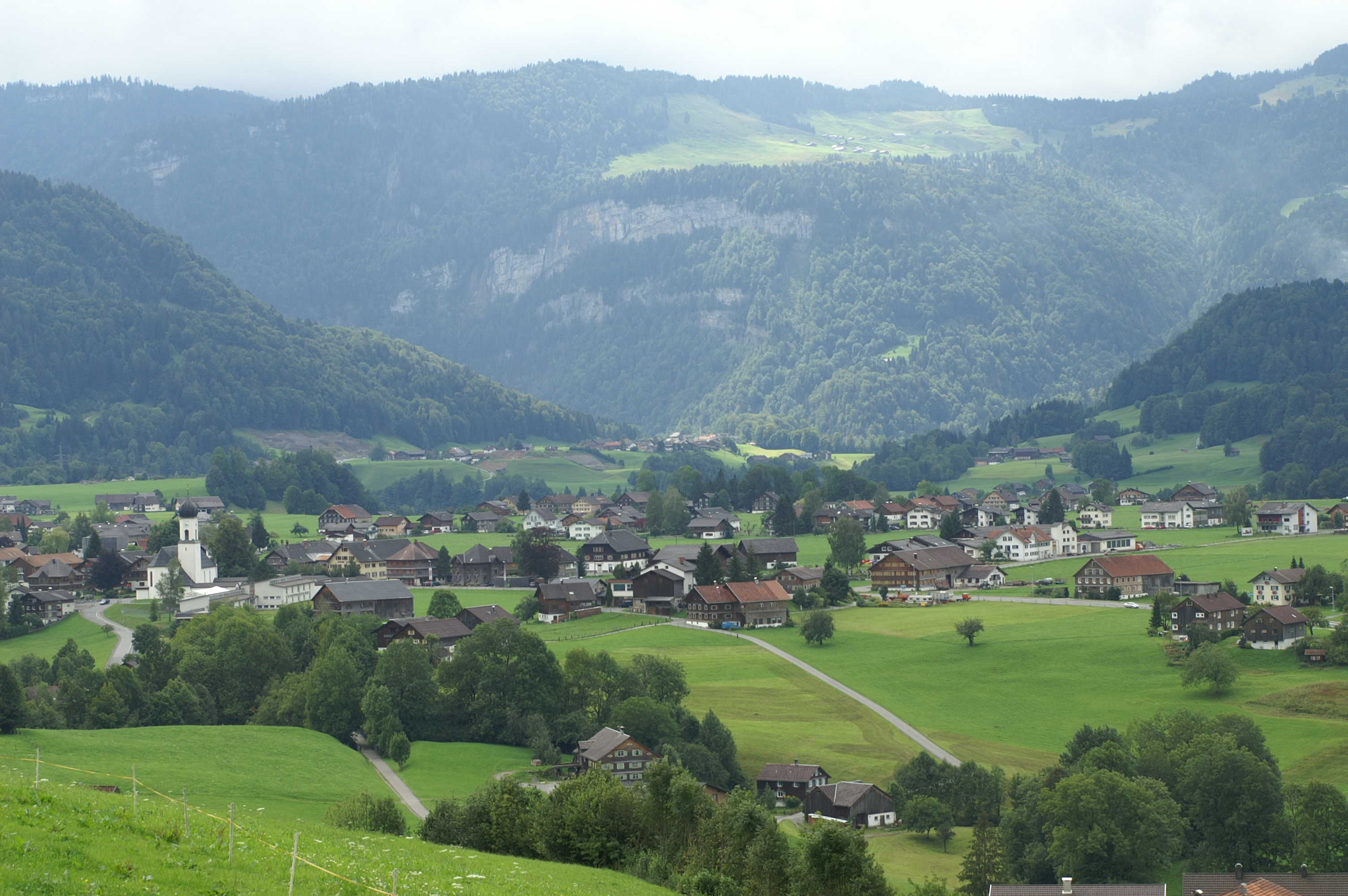
- Andelsbuch

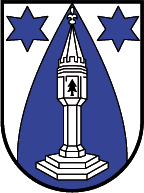
- Coat of arms

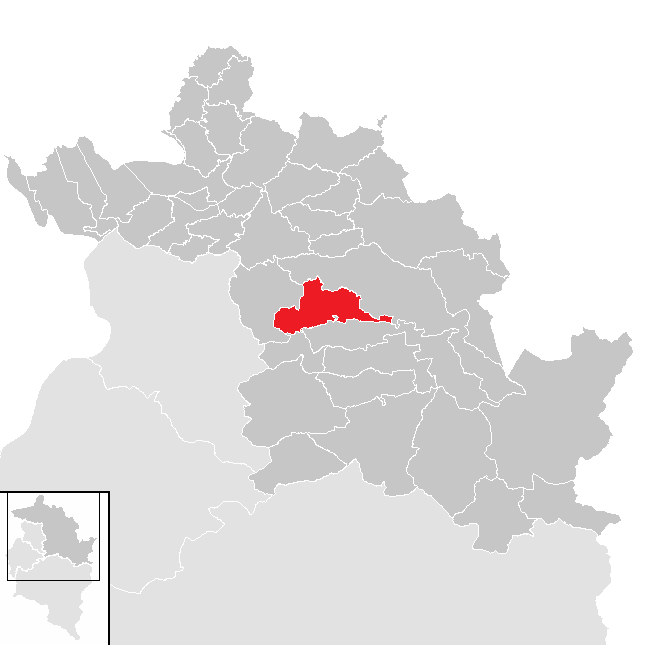
- Location in the district

- Location within Austria
- Coordinates: 47°24′48″N 09°53′46″E
- Country: Austria
- State: Vorarlberg
- District: Bregenz

Government
  - Mayor: Bernhard Kleber (Bürgerliste)

Area
  - Total: 19.56 km^{2} (7.55 sq mi)
- Elevation: 613 m (2,011 ft)

Population (2018-01-01)
  - Total: 2,565
  - Density: 131.1/km^{2} (339.6/sq mi)
- Time zone: UTC+1 (CET)
  - Summer (DST): UTC+2 (CEST)
- Postal code: 6866
- Area code: 05512
- Vehicle registration: B
- Website: www.andelsbuch.at

Andelsbuch is a municipality in the district of Bregenz in the Austrian state of Vorarlberg.

== Population ==
Historical population
Year	Pop.	±%
1869	1,331	—
1880	1,149	−13.7%
1890	1,129	−1.7%
1900	1,234	+9.3%
1910	1,257	+1.9%
1923	1,170	−6.9%
1934	1,164	−0.5%
1939	1,267	+8.8%
1951	1,380	+8.9%
1961	1,467	+6.3%
1971	1,685	+14.9%
1981	1,904	+13.0%
1991	2,103	+10.5%
2001	2,287	+8.7%
2011	2,328	+1.8%

== Initiatives ==
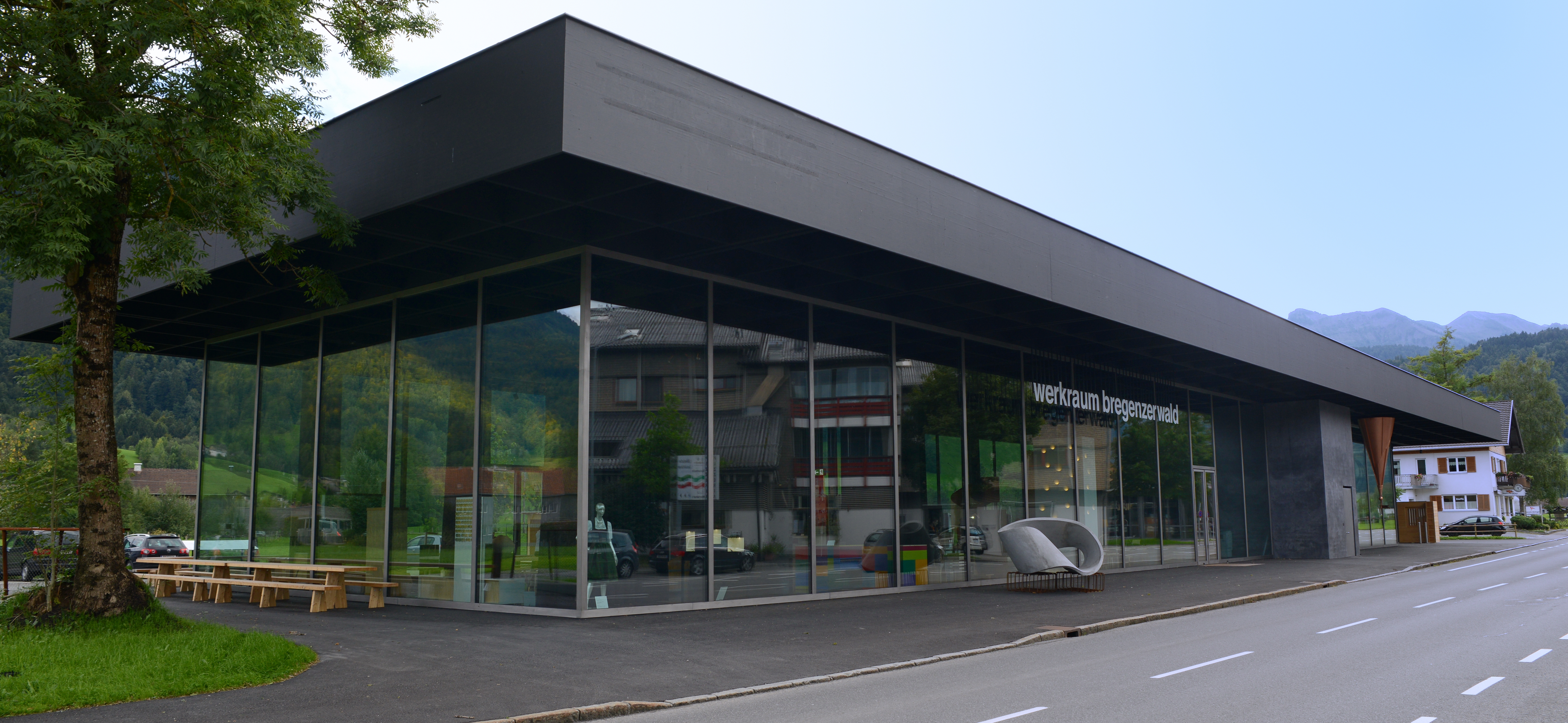
The "Werkraum Haus" of the Werkraum Bregenzerwald: a place for exchange, education and networking in the field of architecture and crafts

The Werkraum Bregenzerwald is an association of craftsmen in the Bregenz Forest founded in 1999. It aims at networking and supporting craft, design and technology businesses in the area. The publicly accessible place is used to present the craftsmanship, to promote building culture in cooperation with architects and to increase design competence and quality of craftsmanship with the preferred involvement of young people.

In 2013, the Werkraum Haus opened in the center of Andelsbuch. The house was planned by the well-known Swiss architect Peter Zumthor and built by the member companies of the Werkraum Bregenzerwald.

== Notable people ==
- Martina Rüscher (born 1972), politician (ÖVP)
