= Eva Maria Waibel =

Austrian high school teacher and former politician

Eva Maria Waibel (née König; born 1 November 1953, Dornbirn, Austria) is an Austrian high school teacher and former politician for the Austrian People's Party (ÖVP). Waibel was, from May 1995 to October 2000, the regional minister of the provincial government of Vorarlberg.

== Early life, education and profession ==
Eva Maria Waibel was born 1 November 1953, the daughter of Gebhard and Senta König in Dornbirn. She attended elementary school and the federal gymnasium in Dornbirn, where she passed her matura in 1972. She then graduated from the Pedagogical Academy of Vorarlberg in Feldkirch and her Lehramt training in Vienna for primary and secondary schools in the subjects of German and history. She then worked as a primary and secondary school teacher as well as teaching assignments at a polytechnic university.

From 1985 to 1989, she studied part-time at the University of Innsbruck in pedagogy and psychology and graduated in 1989 with a Master philosophiæ (Mag. Phil.). From 1990 to 1995, Waibel took up a teaching position at the Pedagogical Academy in Feldkirch and graduated after which she had psychotherapy training at the Society for logotherapy in Vienna. In 1993, Waibel earned another doctorate philosophiæ (Dr. phil.) at the University of Innsbruck.

In 1995, a change took place in the national policy, and Waibel left the apprenticeship for the time being. After her retirement from politics in 2000, she returned to teaching and worked as a visiting professor at the Trinity Western University in Canada. In November 2001, Waibel was supported by the government of the Swiss canton of Lucerne and was appointed head of the local services in teacher training. She started this position in early 2002 and governed it until 2006.

From 2006 to 2014, Waibel began to work as a lecturer at the College of Education of Central Switzerland, where she taught pedagogy, educational psychology and general didactic method. At the same time she was, from 2008 to 2012, also at the Pedagogical University of Tyrol, where she was jointly responsible for teaching at the Centre for human sciences. Since 2012, Waibel has been working at the Pedagogical University of Carinthia (Viktor Frankl University). She teaches social and sociological disciplines.

== Political career ==
Waibel was, by 1977, a member in the Austrian Workers' Federation and the Austrian women's movement, two subsidiary organizations of the ÖVP. From 1992 to 2001, she was Deputy Head of State at the Austrian Academy of Music in Vorarlberg. From 1996 to 2001 she was also the head of the women's movement in Vorarlberg.

On 17 May 1995, Waibel became the successor of Minister of Education in the federal government as regional minister after Elisabeth Gehrer. Waibel had previously been in the Vorarlberg Landtag and therefore was considered a newcomer in the country's politics. As Regional Minister, Waibel and subsequently overlook the departments of Education, Science and Training, Youth and Family and Women and development cooperation in the Vorarlberg state government. At the same time she was also leading President of Vorarlberg in the course of the political activities in the Landesschulrat.

Waibel voluntarily resigned on 11 October 11, 2000, leaving the Vorarlberg state government, according to her own statement, to return to their original occupational fields. Her successor as Regional Minister was Greti Schmid.
