= Albert Knoll =

Austrian theologian (1796–1863)

Albert Knoll (12 July 1796, at Bruneck in what was central Tyrol – 30 March 1863, at Bolzano) was an Austrian Capuchin dogmatic theologian.

== Life ==
He was ordained to the priesthood in November, 1818, and five years later was appointed to teach dogmatic theology in the Capuchin convent at Merano. He held this position for 25 years. Having been elected to the office of definitor general in 1847, he went to Rome, but returned to Bolzano, in 1853, when his term of office had expired.

== Works ==
While at Rome he wrote his Institutiones Theologi Dogmatic Generalis seu Fundamentalis (Innsbruck, 1852). The following year he published at Turin the first volume of his Institutiones Theologiae Theoreticae seu Dogmatico-Polemicæ, which was followed by five other volumes, the last one appearing in 1859.

He wrote a compendium in two volumes of the Institutiones Theologiæ Theoreticæ which was published at Turin in 1868. The last edition of the larger work, corrected and amended by Gottfried of Graun, was published at Innsbruck in 1893. Knoll's Exposito Regulæ Fratrum Minorum, a treatise on the obligations of the Franciscan rule, has been commended as a faithful interpretation of the spirit of Francis of Assisi.

== Sources ==
The entry cites:

  - Hurter, Nomenclator Literarius, III, 931-2
