= Greti Schmid =

Austrian politician (born 1954)

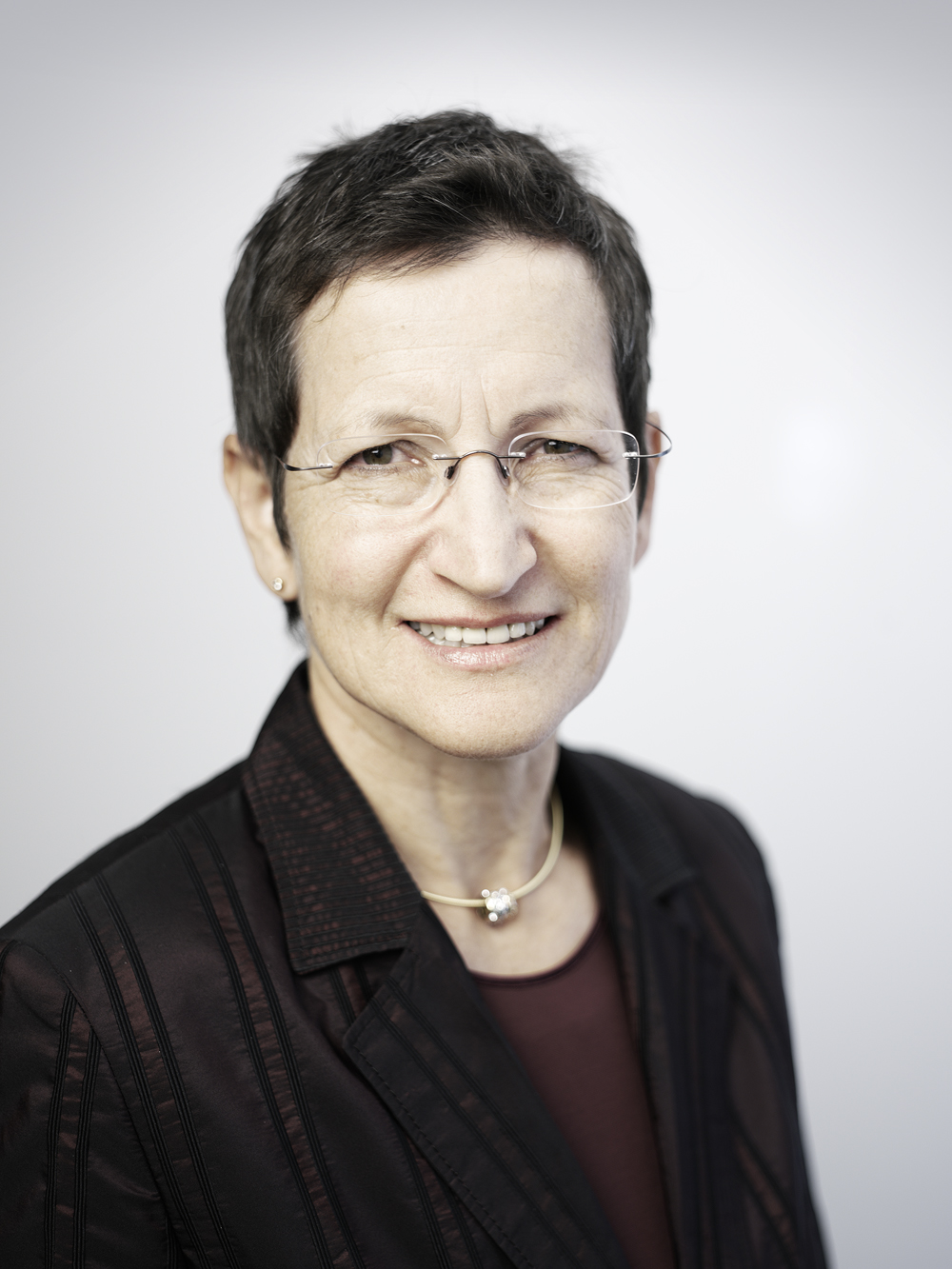
Greti Schmid (2010)

Greti Schmid (née Pohlin; born 24 May 1954) is a former Austrian politician for the Austrian People's Party (ÖVP). Schmid was, from 2000 to 2014, part of the provincial Council in the federal state government of Vorarlberg.

== Education ==
Schmid was born at Bruneck in the South Tyrol in Italy. After graduating from the Department of Commercial Law in Bolzano, Italy, she studied biology at the University of Innsbruck in Austria in 1979. By 1984, she was also an Italian language interpreter. From 1986 to 1988, she worked in the private sector in Bregenz, and, from 1989 to 2000, as an assistant to the hospital management in the Feldkirch country hospital in Feldkirch.

== Political career ==
Schmid began her political activity in Göfis. From 1995 to 2000, she was the local representative of the "Offene Dorfliste" and chairman of the Social Committee. In 1999 and 2000, she was a member of the Landtag for the ÖVP in the Vorarlberg Landtag, and as such she also part of the environmental committee of the Volkspartei. From October 2000 onwards, she was responsible in the areas of family, women, youth and senior citizens, social affairs, nursing and care, development cooperation, information technology and telecommunication policy as a regional councilor in the Vorarlberg provincial government as the successor to Eva Maria Waibel.

In the 14 years of her career, Schmid was a member of a total of four ÖVP-led provincial governments under two different provincial heads. The first time, she was a member of the state governments in the provincial government of Herbert Sausgruber by 11 October 2000, and subsequently became a member of the provincial government under the title of regional governor for new governor Markus Wallner. Already in the run-up to the 2014 Landtagswahl, Schmid announced her withdrawal from politics and thus, after the election, withdrew from the state government.

On the occasion of her departure, Wallner emphasized before the Landtag that her work was characterized by a considerable perseverance and a strong backbone, and to the needs-oriented further development of the social network in Vorarlberg with inter alia the holiday for caring relatives, the "early aid" program, the financial license, home care, the center of competence for child protection and the mobile assistance services.

From February 2001 to March 2015, she was also regional director of the ÖVP women's association in Vorarlberg. Her successor in this function is the regional parliamentarian Martina Rüscher.

== Personal life ==
Schmid is married, has two daughters and lives in Göfis.
