= Alfred Amonn =

Austrian economist

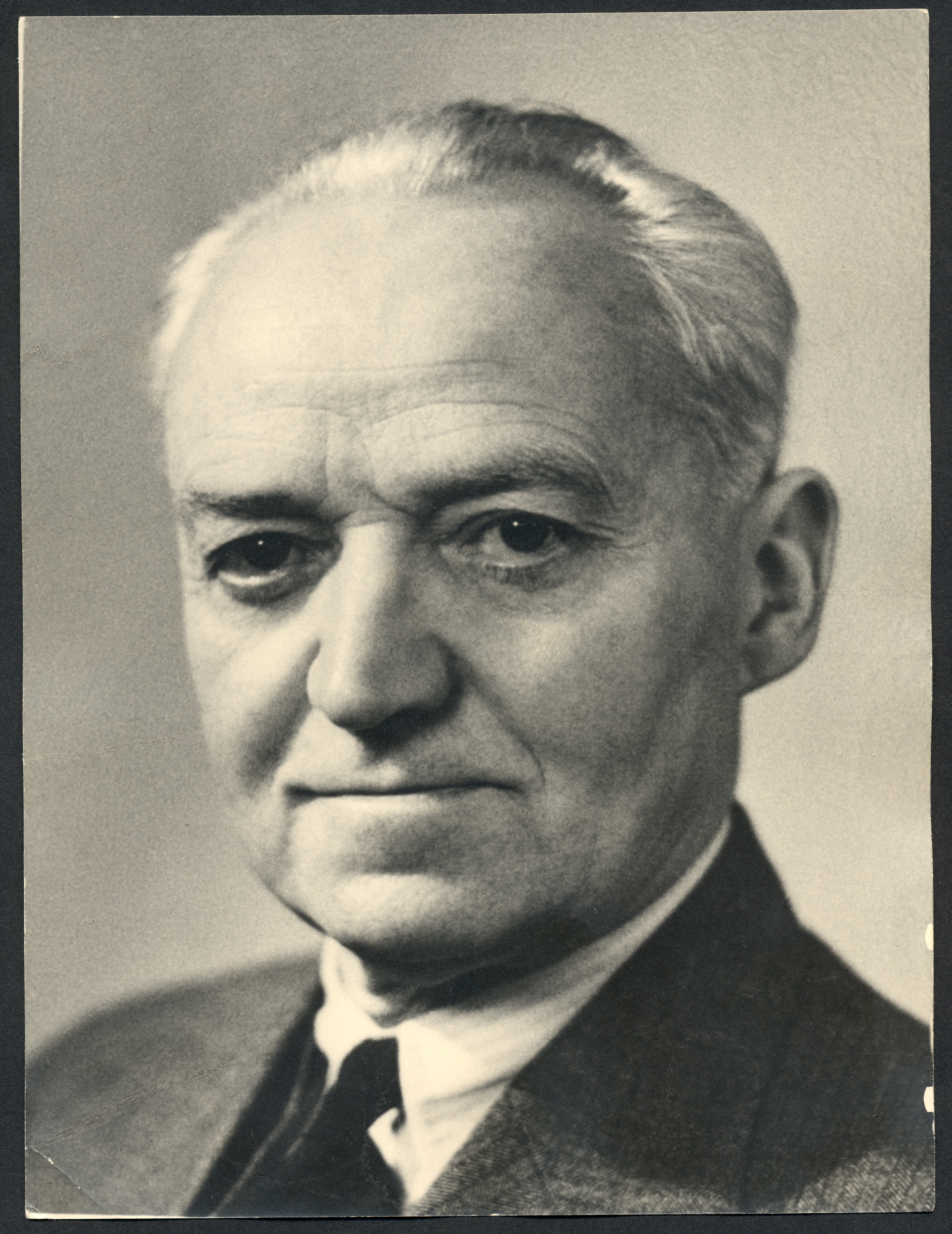
Alfred Amonn

Alfred Amonn (1 June 1883 in Bruneck – 2 November 1962 in Bern) was an Austrian economist (Nationalökonom).

He studied law and economics at the universities of Innsbruck and Vienna, being named an associate professor at the University of Freiburg in 1910. He taught as a professor at Czernowitz University (1912–1920), German Charles-Ferdinand University in Prague (1920–1926), Tokyo University (1926–1929), University of Berne (1929–53; rector in 1949/50).

== Literary works ==
- Objekt und Grundbegriffe der theoretischen Nationalökonomie, 1911 – Object and basic concepts of theoretical economics.
- Ricardo als Begründer der theoretischen Nationalökonomie, 1924 – David Ricardo as founder of theoretical national economy.
- Grundzüge der Volkwohlstandslehre, 1926 – Principles of the popular welfare theory.
- Volkswirtschaftliche Grundbegriffe und Grundprobleme, 1938 – Basic economic concepts and problems.
