= Werkraum Bregenzerwald =

Austrian craftsmen and trader cooperation

- Formation: 1999
- Founded at: Bregenz Forest, Vorarlberg, Austria
- Purpose: Woodworking, Crafts
- Location: Andelsbuch, Vorarlberg, Austria
- Website: http://en.werkraum.at/

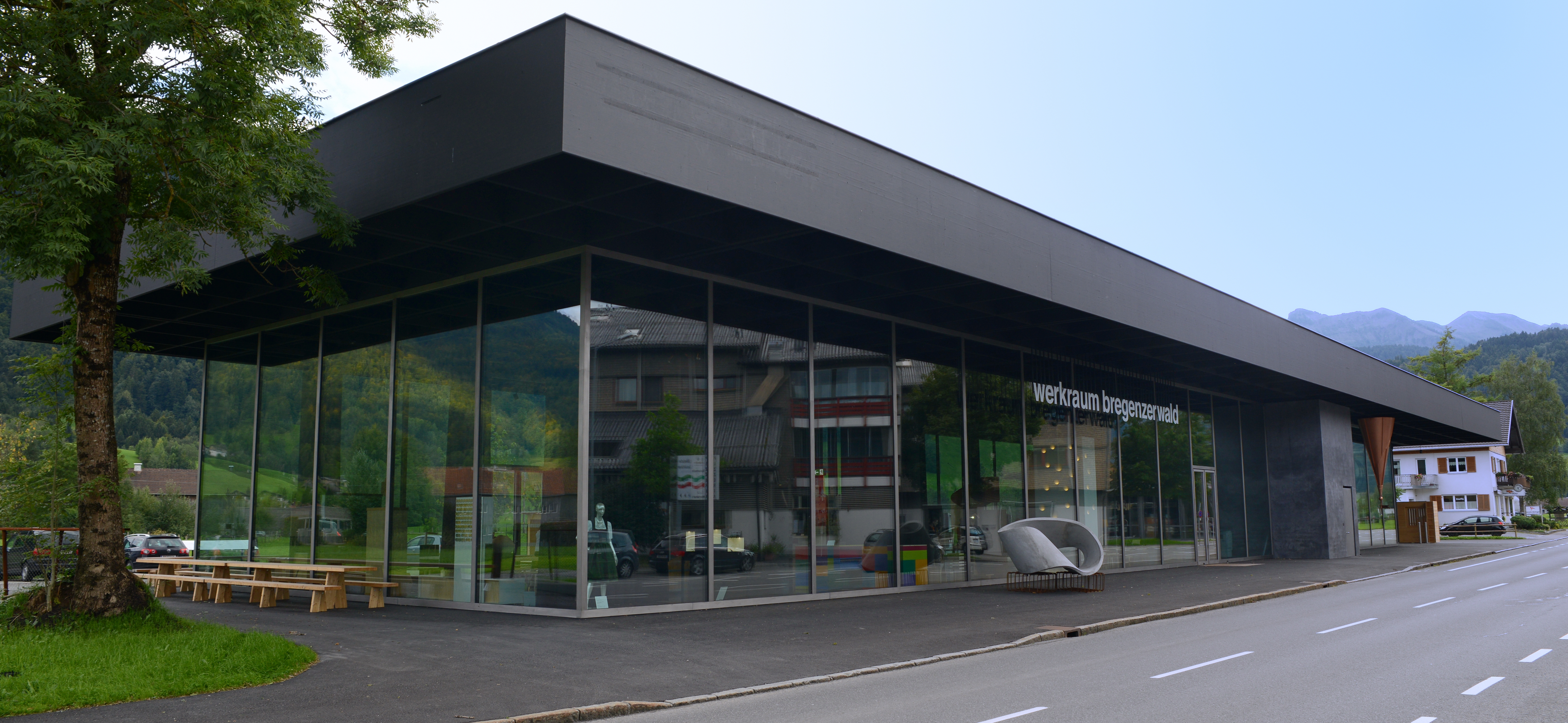
The Werkraumhaus in Andelsbuch

The Werkraum Bregenzerwald (literally "Bregenz Forest workroom") is a cooperation and association of craftsmen and traders in the Bregenz Forest (Austria) founded in 1999.

When the association was founded, almost a third of its members were carpenters. By 2009, the Werkraum Bregenzerwald counted 90 craft, design and technology businesses as association members.

== Philosophy and goals ==
It offers its members institutionalised support in the areas of member service, product and design innovation, education and training, and building culture. By supporting and establishing networks among craftsmen, the Werkraum Bregenzerwald contributes to the regional economic and cultural development. Today, the association is internationally recognised as a model for new crafts.

"Our initiative is not a retrospective utopia, not a response to a crisis. It is a program for the future to secure the young people in this valley the prospect of independent, competitive work and an authentic life." – Werkraum Bregenzerwald

== Werkraumhaus ==
The Werkraumhaus opened in the center of Andelsbuch in 2013. The house was planned by the well-known Swiss architect Peter Zumthor and built by the member companies of the Werkraum Bregenzerwald. Its design is based on two basic ideas: on the one hand, the hall-like building serves as a meeting place and on the other hand as a large showcase, as a shop window for the craft culture in the Bregenz Forest. The costs for the erection of the building amounted to 3.8 million euros.

The Werkraumhaus hosts themed exhibitions, workshops, contests and lectures on craft and building culture as well as presentations of products from the workshops of the member companies. Moreover, it includes a shop and a café.

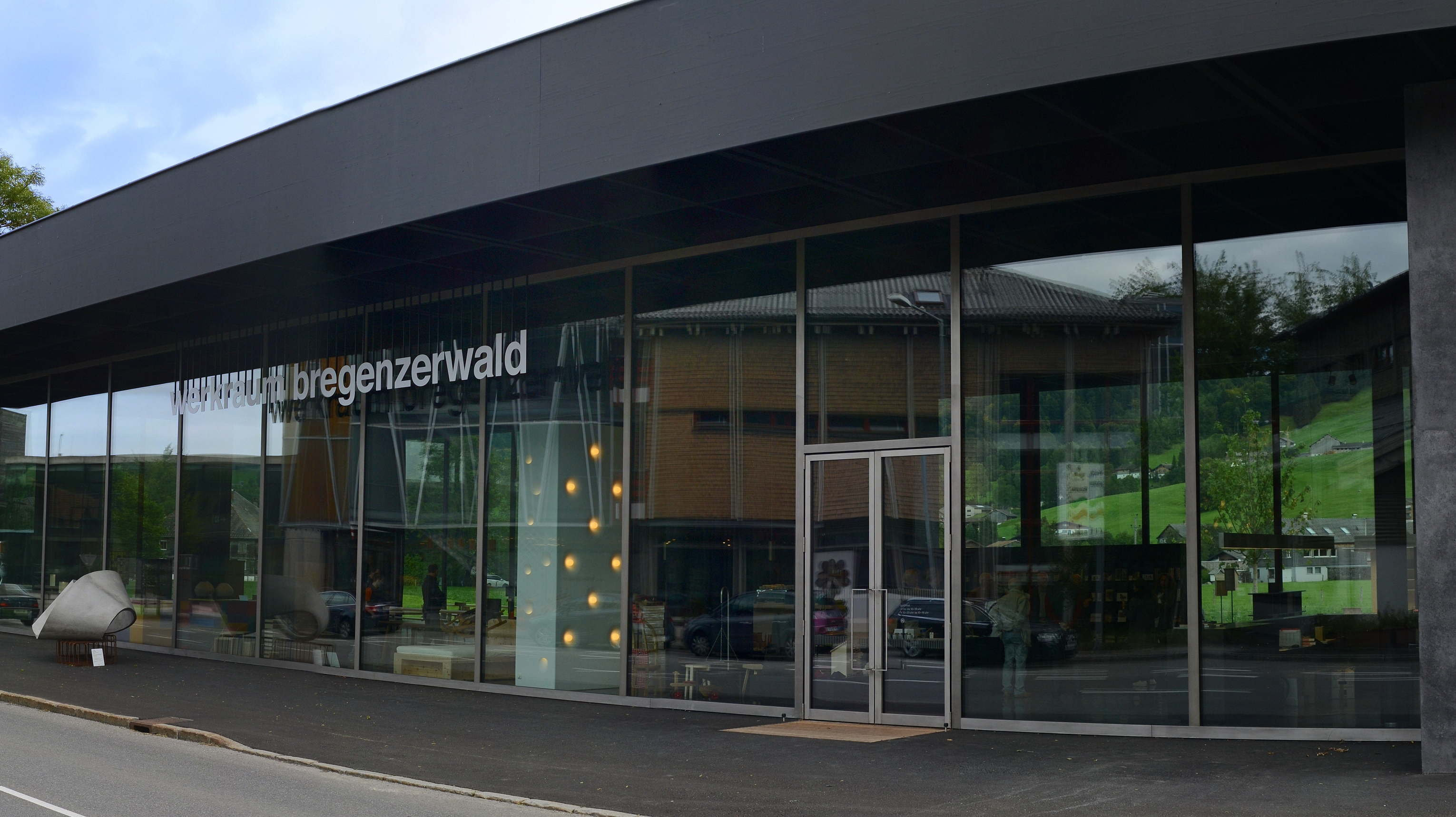

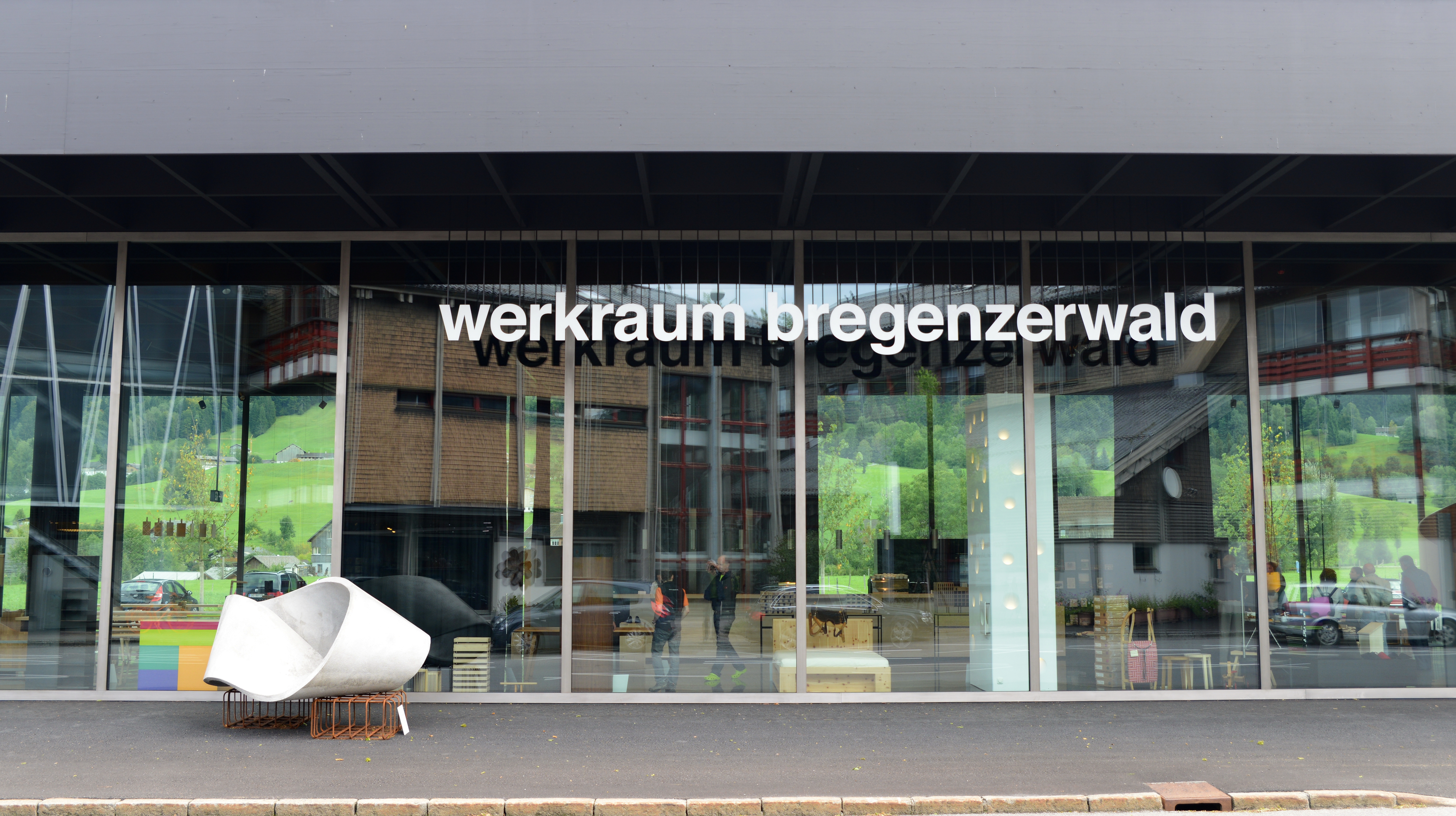

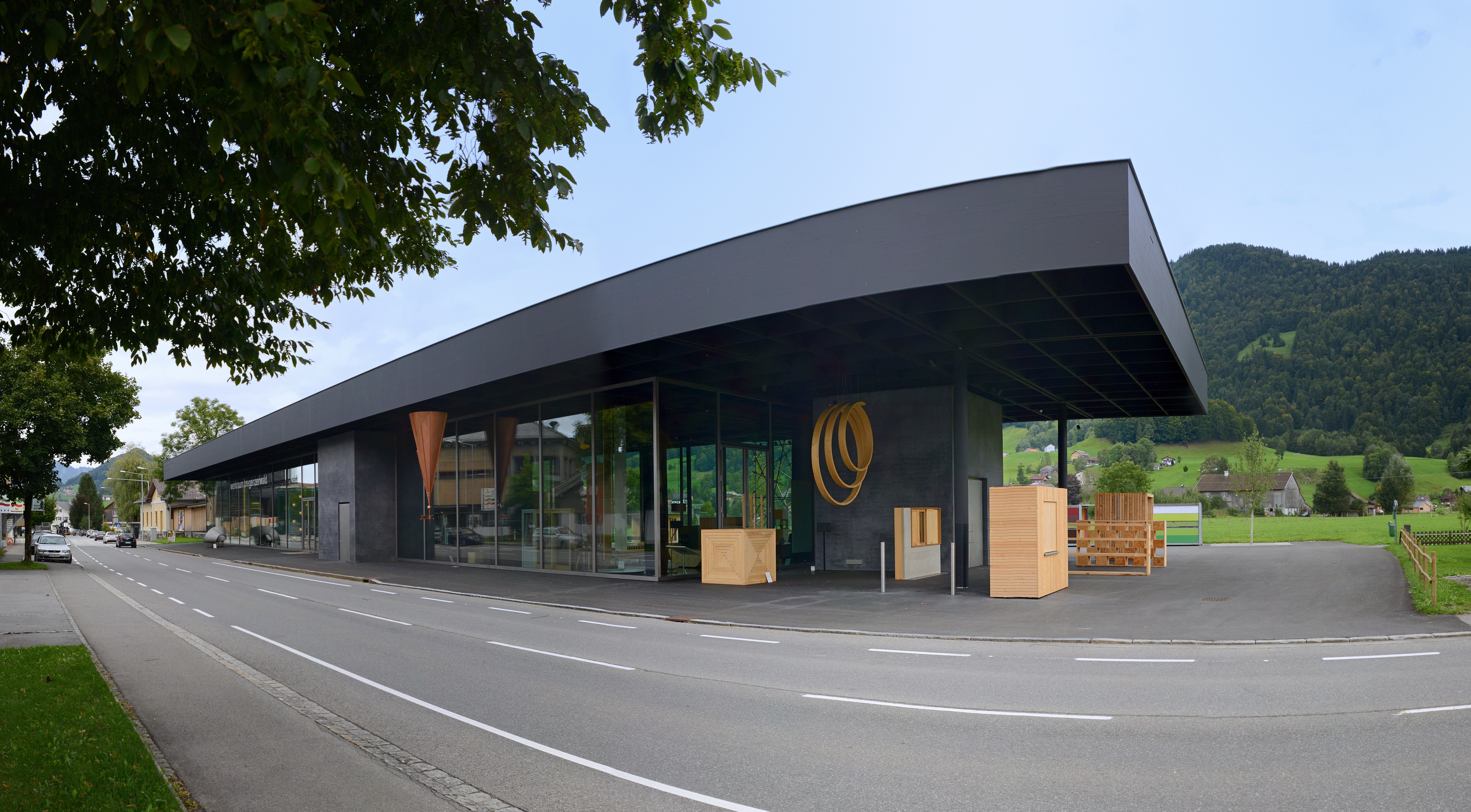

== Werkraum Lädolar ==
The teaching of handicrafts to children and young people is an essential part of the Werkraum program. The Werkraum Lädolar is a display and learning mobile for apprenticeships in the craft. The Lädolars have the size of a table. The development and manufacture of these mobile teaching containers is in the hands of apprentices, masters and designers. The Lädolar can be used anywhere where bundled and experienced knowledge of the craft professions is needed and can be borrowed on request.

With the Werkraum Lädolar, the Werkraum Bregenzerwald received a nomination for the Austrian State Prize for Design 2009.

== Prizes and honors ==
The Werkraumhaus building by architect Peter Zumthor received three architectural awards:

- BTV Bauherrenpreis 2013
- ZV Bauherrenpreis 2014
- 7. Vorarlberger Hypo-Bauherrenpreis 2015

At the 2016 UNESCO conference in Addis Ababa (Ethiopia), the Werkraum Bregenzerwald was included in the “International Register of Good Practical Examples for the Conservation of the intangible cultural heritage” (see International Register of Good Safeguarding Practice).
