= Martina Rüscher =

Austrian politician (born 1972)

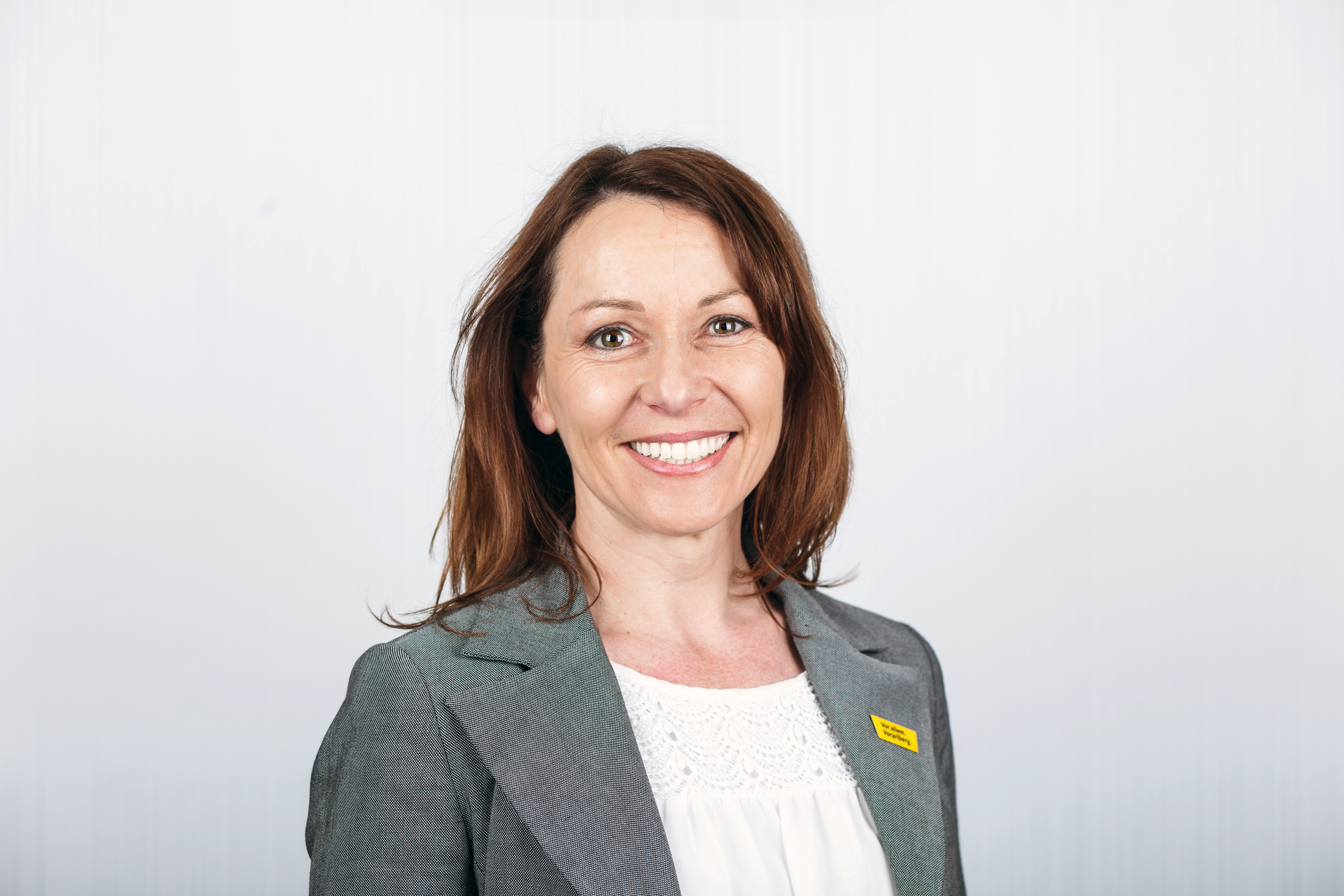
Martina Rüscher (2014)

Martina Rüscher (née Valentini; born 25 July 1972, in Innsbruck, Austria) is an Austrian politician for the Austrian People's Party (ÖVP) and communications consultant. She has been, since 2014, a member of the parliament of Vorarlberg.

Rüscher is married, has three sons and lives in Andelsbuch in the Bregenz Forest.

== Education and profession ==
Born Martina Valentini, she was born in 1972 in Innsbruck and grew up in Landeck in Tyrol. From 1986 to 1991, she attended the College for Economic Occupations in Innsbruck and graduated there. From 1991 to 1993, she also studied at the Economic and Foreign Language Academy of the University of Salzburg.

Starting in 1993, Rüscher worked at the Handl Tyrol company in Pians, where Rüscher was involved in export of office staff. From 1995 to 1996, she was subsequently head of the purchasing department at Art Verlag in Innsbruck. In 1996, she married physiotherapist Michael Rüscher in Innsbruck and moved to Andelsbuch in the Bregenzerwald. At the same time, she took a new job at the Zumtobel Staff GmbH in Dornbirn, where she was working as an assistant in marketing communication. In 1998, Rüscher finally formed her independent company, and subsequently founded the company VIA3 Communications in 2003.

In 2010, Rüscher obtained certifications to become a project manager, and in 2012 she completed her academic courses in business management. In 2014, she earned her Master of Business Administration degree in General Management Competences at the Danube University Krems. By 2015, she completed university courses in PR and Integrated Communication at the University of Krems.

== Political Work ==
In 1998, Rüscher joined the Austrian Economic Alliance and thus the Austrian People's Party. She has been a member of the local council in her hometown of Andelsbuch since 2000. Only in the run-up state elections in Vorarlberg in 2014 was her candidacy for the Vorarlberg branch of the Austrian People's Party known. Rüscher eventually won a seat in Parliament in her constituency of Bregenz and was thus first sworn in on 15 October 2014 at the state parliament building. In her 30th legislative period, Rüscher was appointed the area spokeswoman for the ÖVP parliament for health, women and child care.

Since 4 March 2015, Rüscher has been the successor of Greti Schmid as Provincial Director of the Women's Movement in the Vorarlberg branch of the Austrian People's Party. At the state convention of the Vorarlberg branch of the Austrian People's Party on 9 May 2015, Rüscher was voted as one of the deputies of the State Party.
