= Cultural depictions of Medea =

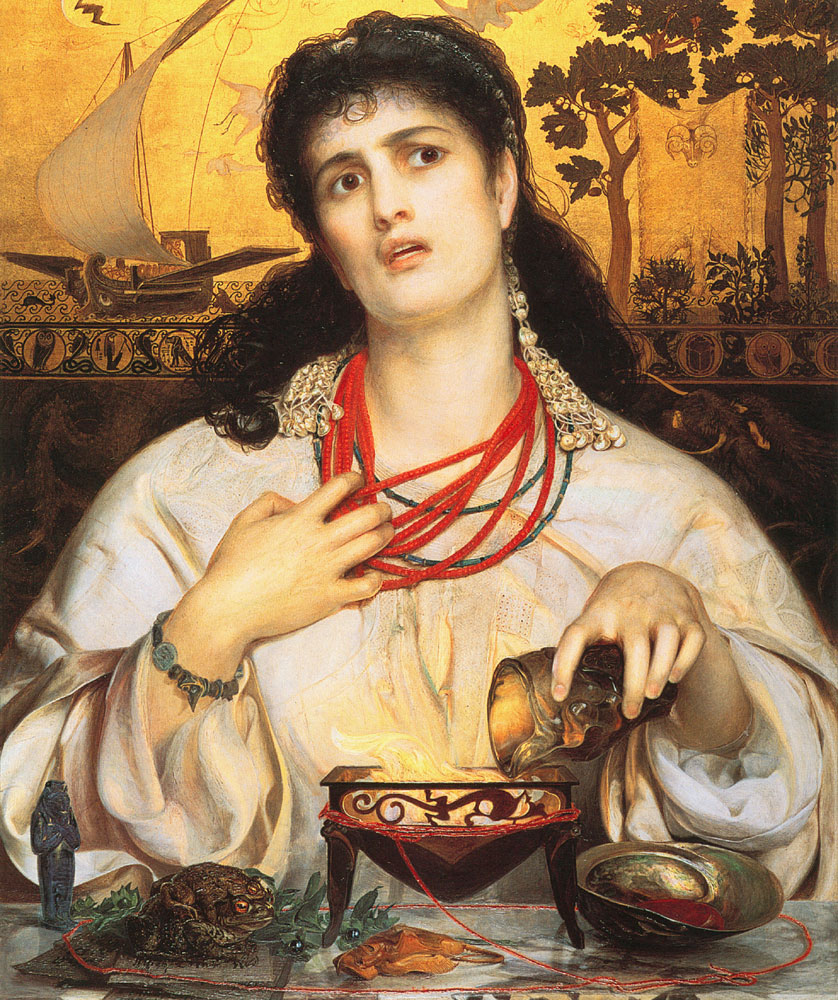
Medea by Anthony Frederick Augustus Sandys (painted 1866-68); its rejection for exhibition at the Royal Academy in 1868 caused a storm of protest

The dramatic episodes in which Greek mythology character Medea plays a role have ensured that she remains vividly represented in popular culture. Titles are ordered chronologically.

== Literature ==
- In Cicero's court case Pro Caelio (56 BC), the name Medea is mentioned several times, as a way to make fun of Clodia, sister of Publius Clodius Pulcher, the man who exiled Cicero.
- Medea (Ovid's lost tragedy; two lines are extant)
- Geoffrey Chaucer, The Legend of Good Women (1386)
- In La Tavola Ritonda (c. 15th century), Medea lives on as the marvelously beautiful mistress of the island Perfida's Cruel Castle (Castello Crudele) in which she imprisons the hero Tristano (Tristan), as "every year she wanted to bent a [different] knight to her pleasure" for she was "the most lecherous woman in the world". Tristano, faithful to his true love Isolda, manages to escape from Medea's magic castle.
- William Morris Life and Death of Jason (epic poem, 1867)
- Robert Graves, Hercules, My Shipmate (1945)
- Dorothy M. Johnson, Witch Princess (1967)
- John Gardner, Jason and Medeia (1973)
- Otar Chiladze, A Man Was Going Down the Road (1973)
- H. M. Hoover, The Dawn Palace: The Story of Medea (1988)
- Percival Everett, For Her Dark Skin (1990)
- Kerry Greenwood, Medea: Book I in the Delphic Women Series (1997).
- Christa Wolf, Medea (published in German 1996, translated to English 1998)
- Medea plays a major role as an antagonist in Stuart Hill's The Icemark Chronicles trilogy.
- In Rick Riordan's The Lost Hero (2010), Medea, having been resurrected by vengeful goddess Gaea (Mother Earth), runs a department store in Chicago. She appears again in The Burning Maze and is shown to work under Caligula.
- David Vann, Bright Air Black (2017) retells Medea's story in prose poetry from a third person perspective.
- Madeline Miller, Circe (2018) narrates Medea's visit to her aunt Circe to be cleansed for the killing of her brother.
- Ben Morgan, Medea in Corinth (2018) is a sequence of poems and dramatic interludes which focus on Medea's religious encounter with Hecate. It includes a sonnet sequence composed of letters to Creusa, her love rival, illuminating their relationship.
- Rosie Hewlett's Medea (2024) retells Medea's story from the first-person perspective.
- In 2024, Dark Horse Comics released the English version of Medea, a Belgian graphic novel retelling written by Blandine Le Callet and illustrated by Nancy Peña.

== Theatre ==
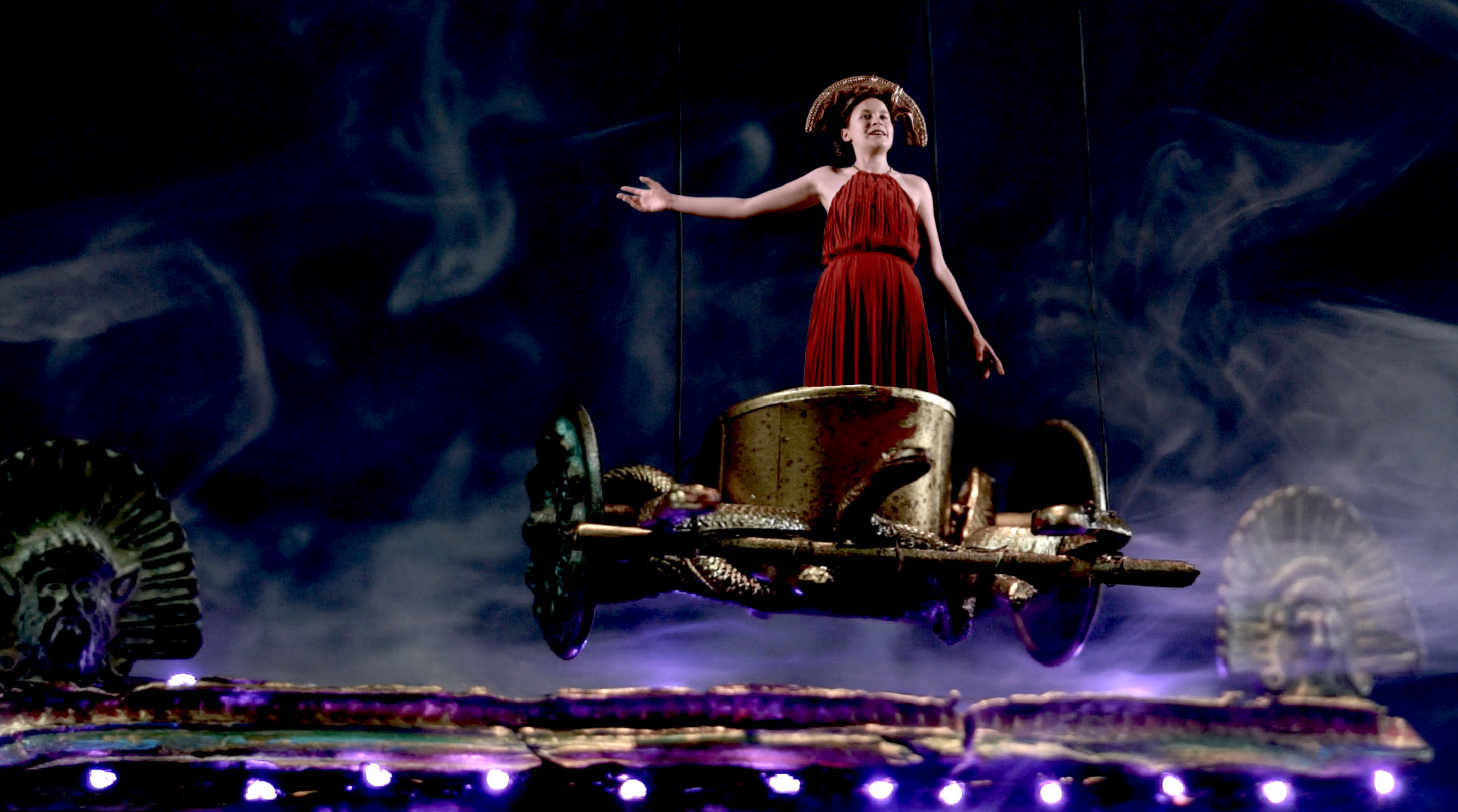
Olivia Sutherland in MacMillan Films staging (2016)

- Pierre Corneille, Médée (1635)
- Charles Johnson, Medea (1730)
- Richard Glover, Medea (1762)
- Georg Anton Benda's melodrama, Medea (1775), based on a text by Friedrich Wilhelm Gotter.
- Anonymous, The Sorceress (1814)
- Amy Levy, Medea: a Fragment (1882)
- Franz Grillparzer, Das goldene Vließ (en: The Golden Fleece) (1821)
- Ernest Legouvé, Médée (1856)
- Hans Henny Jahnn, Medea (1926)
- Peter Kien's Medea: An der Bose (en: On the Border), a play written while Kien was interned at the Theresienstadt Ghetto and never performed, having been hidden in Auschwitz until after his death in 1944.
- American composer Samuel Barber wrote his Medea ballet (later renamed The Cave of the Heart) in 1947 for Martha Graham and derived from that Medea's Meditation & Dance of Vengeance Op. 23a in 1955. The musical Blast! uses an arrangement of Barber's Medea as their end to Act I.
- Jean Anouilh's Médée (1946), which centers around Medea, Jason, Creon, and Medea's nurse, and was premiered at Théâtre de l'Atelier in Paris on March 25, 1953.
- Robinson Jeffers' retelling, first performed in 1947.
- A. R. Gurney's The Golden Fleece.
- Chico Buarque and Paulo Pontes' Gota d'Água (1975)
- Heiner Müller, Medeamaterial (1974) and the supplementary Medeaplay text (1983).
- Chrysanthos Mentis Bostantzoglou (Bost)'s 1993 parody.
- Cherríe Moraga's The Hungry Woman: A Mexican Medea (1995) combines classical Greek myth Medea with the Mexicana/o legend of La Llorona and the Aztec myth of lunar deity Coyolxauhqui.
- Marina Carr's By the Bog of Cats (1998) is loosely inspired by the Medea myth.
- Dea Loher's Manhattan Medea, which premiered in 1999 in Graz, is set in modern-day Manhattan; Medea and Jason are living as illegal immigrants, until Jason marries the daughter of a rich businessman, abandoning Medea and their child; the play takes place on their wedding night.
- Michael John LaChiusa scored Marie Christine, a Broadway musical with heavy opera influence based on the story of Medea. The production premiered at the Vivian Beaumont Theater in December 1999 for a limited run under Lincoln Center Theater. LaChuisa's score and book were nominated for a Tony Award in 2000, as was a tour-de-force performance by six-time Tony winner Audra McDonald.
- Laurent Gaudé, Médée Kali (2003), first performed at the Théâtre du Rond-Point.
- In 2012, Australian playwrights Kate Mulvany and Anne-Louise Sarks retold the myth of Medea from her and Jason's doomed children's points of view.
- Helen McCrory played Medea in the Royal National Theatre's acclaimed production in 2014.
- Hannah Shepherd-Hulford played Medea in the Lost Dog dance-theatre production of Ruination at the Royal Opera House in 2022.

=== Opera ===
- Francesco Cavalli, Giasone (1649)
- Jean-Baptiste Lully, Thésée (1674)
- Marc-Antoine Charpentier, Médée (tragédie en musique, 1693). Also staged at the English National Opera by David McVicar (director) and Sarah Connolly (Médée) in 2013.
- George Frideric Handel, Teseo (Theseus) (1713)
- Joseph François Salomon, Médée et Jason (1713)
- Luigi Cherubini, Médée (1797); it is Cherubini's best-known work, but better known by its Italian version, Medea. A lost aria, which Cherubini apparently smudged out in spite more than 200 years ago, was revealed by x-ray scans.
- Simon Mayr, Medea in Corinto (1813), composed to a libretto of Giuseppe Felice Romani, and premiered in Naples.
- Saverio Mercadante, Medea (1851), composed to a libretto by Salvadore Cammarano.
- Darius Milhaud, Médée (1939), composed to a text by Madeleine Milhaud.
- Ray E. Luke's Medea won the 1979 Rockefeller Foundation/New England Conservatory Competition for Best New American Opera.
- Mikis Theodorakis, Medea (1991), premiered at the Teatro Arriaga. This was the first in Theodorakis' trilogy of lyrical tragedies, the others being Electra and Antigone.
- Chamber Made, Medea (1993), composed by Gordon Kerry, with text by Justin Macdonnell, after Seneca.
- Oscar Strasnoy, Midea (2) (2000), based on Irina Possamai's libretto, premiered at Teatro Caio Melisso, Spoleto, Italy. It won the 2000 Orpheus Opera Award.
- Aribert Reimann, Medea (2011), which premiered at the Vienna State Opera, directed by Marco Arturo Marelli, with Marlis Petersen in the title role.

== Art ==
- Eugène Delacroix, Médée furieuse, 1862, Paris, musée du Louvre.
- Victor Mottez, Médée, 1865, château de Blois, musée des Beaux-Arts.
- Aimé Nicolas Morot, Médée, 1876, Bar-le-Duc, musée barrois.
- Alfons Mucha, poster for Médée at the Théâtre de la Renaissance, 1898, Paris, musée des Arts Décoratifs.
- Frederick Sandys, Medea, 1868, Birmingham Museum and Art Gallery.
- Anselm Feuerbach, Medea, 1870, Munich, Neue Pinakothek.
- Anselm Feuerbach, Medea mit dem Dolche, 1895, Kunsthalle Mannheim.
- Valentine Cameron Prinsep, Medea the Sorceress, 1880, London, Southwark Heritage Centre.
- Evelyn De Morgan, Medea, 1889, Williamson Art Gallery and Museum.
- John William Waterhouse depicted Jason and Medea in Jason and Medea.
- Thomas Satterwhite Noble depicted Margaret Garner, an American slave woman who killed two of her children to spare them from slavery, in The Modern Medea.

== Music ==
- Louis-Nicholas Clerambault, Médée (1710), cantata for soprano, violin and continuo, 1710)
- Antonio Caldara, Medea in Corinto (1711), cantata for alto, 2 violins and basso continuo, 1711)
- Jacob Druckman's orchestral work, Prism (1980), is based on three different renderings of the Medea myth by Charpentier, Cavalli, and Cherubini. Each movement incorporates material and quotations from the music of Druckman's three predecessors. At the time of his death, Druckman was writing a large-scale grand opera on the Medea myth commissioned by the Metropolitan Opera.
- Insomnium, Medeia, song, released on the Finnish death metal band's album In the Halls of Awaiting (2002).
- Vienna Teng, My Medea, song, from the album Warm Strangers (2004).
- The Hanslick Rebellion, Medea my Mistress, song, from the album the rebellion is here (2005).
- Spinvis, Medea, from the album Goochelaars & Geesten (2007).
- The Showdown, Medea - One Foot In Hell, song, from their album Back Breaker (2008).
- Dietmar Bonnen, Medea, instrumental chamber music piece (2008).
- Kayak, Medea, on Coming Up For Air (2008).
- Rockettothesky (Jenny Hval), Medea, album (13 October 2008).
- Mauro Lanza (music) and Angelin Prelijocaj (choreography), Le Songe De Médée, a ballet for the Ballet de l'Opéra national de Paris and featured in the film La Danse.
- Battleroar, The Curse of Medea, from Blood of Legends (2014).
- Ex Libris, Medea, album (2014), a concept album which tells the tragic story of Medea.
- Eleni Karaindrou, Medea (2014, ECM), composition for lavta, ney, clarinets, violoncello, santouri, bendir, and choir
- Chat Pile, Family Funeral, song, released on the Oklahoma City-based noise rock band's album Who Loves the Sun (2026).

== Cinema and television ==
- Jason and the Argonauts (movie, 1963), starring Nancy Kovack as Medea. Medea is a temple dancer who Jason saves after her ship sinks, causing her to help him.
- Medea (movie, 1969), directed by Pier Paolo Pasolini, starring Maria Callas.
- A Dream of Passion (movie, 1978), starring Melina Mercouri as Maya, an actress who is portraying Medea and seeks out Brenda Collins (Ellen Burstyn), a mother who recently murdered her children.
- Medea (movie, 1988), dir. Lars von Trier, filmed for Danish television using a pre-existing script by filmmaker Carl Theodor Dreyer. Cast included Udo Kier and Kirsten Olesen.
- Highway to Hell (movie, 1992), starring Anne Meara.
- The Baby of Mâcon (movie, 1993), starring Julia Ormond, contains elements of the Medea myth.
- Jason and the Argonauts (miniseries, 2000), starring Jolene Blalock and presented by Hallmark.
- In the 2002 biopic of Mexican artist Frida Kahlo, Diego Rivera's previous wife Lupe Marín (played by Valeria Golino) and Frida Kahlo (played by Salma Hayek) talk of Lupe's response to Diego's infidelity. In response, Frida points a knife in a non-threatening gesture at Lupe, and calls her "Medea".
- Medea (miniseries, 2005), directed by Theo van Gogh, an adaptation placing Medea in Dutch politics.
- Médée Miracle (movie, 2007), directed by Tonino De Bernardi, starring Isabelle Huppert as Medea; a modern version of the myth set in Paris. The character of Medea lives in Paris with Jason, who leaves her.
- Medeya (2009), dir. Natalia Kuznetsova, a pioneer of a genre styled by the director as "Rhythmodrama".
- Atlantis (TV series, 2013), featuring Amy Manson as Medea.
- Olympus (TV series, 2015), featuring Sonita Henry as Medea.
- The 2015 television series Doctor Foster was inspired by the myth of Medea.
- Between June and August 2016, the Cuban broadcasting radio Progreso presented the 60 chapters series The Mark of Medea written by Orelvis Linares and directed by Alfredo Fuentes. In the series, two women commit crimes inspired by the myth of Medea. This first of them castrates her lover in revenge by his treason. The second one drowns her own four-year-old daughter in a pond because the baby disturbed her plans of living with her lover.

== Video games ==
- Liquid Entertainment's 2008 video game Rise of the Argonauts portrays Medea as a dark sorceress and a defector from a cult of Hecate-worshiping assassins.
- In the 2004 visual novel as well as the anime adaptations of Fate/stay night, Medea appears as a relatively major character under the title of Caster. She can also be summoned as Servant Caster in the mobile game Fate/Grand Order in two variants: as an adult who experienced Jason's betrayal already and as a young teen in the time of her just meeting Jason called "Medea Lily". In the stories of Fuyuki, Older Medea has become an antagonist, while in the Okeanos storyline, where her younger self lies with Jason in the ship, Argo, she is both the protagonist and the antagonist.
- The Persona of Chidori Yoshino in Persona 3 (2006) and its rereleases (FES, Portable and Reload) is portrayed with the skull of a ram and curly yellow hair, most likely representing her involvement in the story of the golden fleece.
- In the 2025 video game Hades II (the sequel to Hades), "Lady Medea", an accomplished pharmakís and fellow sorceress of the protagonist Melinoë, is the 'Helpful-Hand' character, for "Ephyra" the 1st Surface Biome, having been stationed up there prior by Lady Hecate to be her eyes and ears there. Lady Medea when encountered will offer Melinoë curses that positively affect the run.
