= Characters in the Icemark Chronicles =

This is a list of characters in The Icemark Chronicles by Stuart Hill. These fictional characters are sorted by the book they appeared in, and by alphabetical order:

== The Cry of the Icemark ==
=== Elemnestra, Basilea of the Hypolitan ===
Elemnestra was the leader of the Hypolitan. She was also Thirrin's aunt. She led the horse archer warriors of the Hypolitan and was married to Olememmnon, Thirrin's uncle. Elemnestra was killed with her mounted archers to save the fyrd and the cavalry, in a battle against the Polypontian cannons.

=== Primplepuss ===
Beloved kitten of King Redrought, she grows up throughout the first book. In the second book, she is very old and has been kept alive by Oskan's healing powers.

=== King Grishmak Blood-Drinker ===
King Grishmak Blood-Drinker is the King of the werewolves. He attacks Thirrin when she goes hunting, but he allows her to live after overpowering her. King Redrought is furious that there is one of the forbidden creatures from the land of the ghosts in his kingdom and orders him killed. However, Thirrin saves him, as he let her live. Because of this, Grishmak allies himself with the Icemark. Grishmak turns out to play an important role in The Cry of the Icemark, being a great help to Thirrin. He also suggests to Cressida that she should go and help her mother at the battle and she and this suggestion saved everyone's life. Stuart Hill said in an interview he based Grishmak on Brian Blessed.

=== King Redrought Strong-In-The-Arm Lindenshield, Bear of the North, ===
King Redrought is the father of Thirrin, and previously the King of the Icemark. Although he is loud and fierce, he enjoys furry slippers and dotes on the Royal Kitten, Primplepuss. He is The Icemark's longest-serving ruler and had fought off enemies like the Corsairs and Vampires. He managed to wipe out the Polypontian's first invading army but paid the ultimate price: his life and the life of all others who had been fighting, the Icemark's army as well as the Empire's. He had taken the axe of Lady Theowin and killed the last of the Polypontian army. He is then taken to Valhalla by what can be assumed to be Valkyries for his afterlife.

=== Maggiore Totus ===
Maggiore Totus, or Maggie as he is often referred to, was Thirrin's tutor until she became Queen. At this time, he became her other Royal Advisor, along with Oskan. He is often portrayed as a voice of reason and knowledge, and Thirrin trusts him well. He is a man of science, and the various things he discovers during the war, such as Vampires, the soldiers of the once thought to be mythical Holly and Oak King, he drastically changes his outlook on nature. In the sequel, The Blade of Fire, (spoiler alert!) Maggie tutors Thirrin's son, Charlemagne. Maggie hails from the Southern Continent and accompanies Charlemagne when he is Regent of the Exiles.

=== Olememmnon Stagapoulos ===
Olememmnon, known as Ollie, is a Hypolitan warrior who was originally the consort of Elemnestra. He is also the commander of the Hypolitan Infantry. In Blade of Fire, (after Elemnestra is killed) Olememmnon marries Olympia, the new Basilea. Olememmnon is notorious for starting drinking competitions with Tharaman-Thar. In The Last Battle of the Icemark he and Olympia are both killed by Erinor's hordes.

=== Oskan Witchfather, the Warlock, Witch's son ===
Oskan is the son of White Annis, a powerful witch. He lived quietly in his cave in the Great Forest for 15 years until he met Thirrin after he gave shelter to her and her hunting party during a storm. Thirrin liked him, and after she became Queen, he became one of her Royal Advisors. His heritage is somewhat of a mystery; his unknown father is supposedly of an ancient and powerful race. This race must once in their lives choose between the Light and the Dark; during his and Thirrin's trip to the Land of the Ghosts, he chooses to follow the Light. Oskan is very pale and has jet-black hair. He is a warlock with healing powers and can read the weather, he also calls on the soldiers of the Holly King and Oak King whenever Thirrin wants to send a message to them. He does not know that he is a warlock until the Vampire Queen tells him, Thirrin, their escort of wolf-folk, their human escort, King Grishmak, and the other Vampires in the room when Thirrin goes to the land of the ghosts to forge an alliance with their Vampiric Majesties. When they get back to the Hypolitan, Wenlock Witchmother and the others with the Gift are there to greet Oskan. Wenlock tells him that he is the most powerful warlock in history so far and that he would be her successor, as Oskan Witchfather, only the second of his kind. During one battle with the Polypontian Empire, he risks his life to save Thirrin, Tharaman-Thar, and their soldiers from certain death by drawing down lightning. It strikes him and he must go down to the cellars where a place has been prepared for him so he can heal. When he is fully healed, he runs from the cellar to ring the solstice bell to tell Thirrin that the allies have come, and they defeat the Polypontian Army for the last battle. He later becomes Thirrin's consort, as we find out in the second book, Blade of Fire, which takes place about 20 years later. He destroys Medea and Cronus in the last book, losing his life as well. He was one of the most powerful beings in the universe and was strong enough to control the darkness and not let it take over his soul.

=== Scipio Bellorum ===
Scipio Bellorum is the greatest general the Polypontian Empire has ever had. He has added numerous countries and provinces to the Empire. He has never lost a war, or even a battle he personally commanded. He is personally feared, as he often slaughters his own troops and officers to make a point, or for the lack of zeal in war. In one battle, he comes out to lead his army for himself and openly challenges Thirrin to one-on-one combat, no interferences. She managed to cut off his hand with his sword still in it and would have killed him if his army hadn't broken the rules and charged in to protect their general. He was killed at the end of Blade of Fire by Thirrin and then eaten by the Vampire Queen, whose husband (the Vampire King) was killed by Bellorum. He also has two sons, Octavious and Sulla, with whom they are both killed by Sharley and Cressida. In an interview in 2010, Hill stated that "Scipio Bellorum is based heavily on Jeremy Irons, in his best “clipped English baddy mode”".

=== Tharaman - One-Hundredth Thar of the Snow Leopards, Ruler of the Icesheets, Scourge of the Ice Trolls ===
Tharaman-Thar is the ruler of the Snow Leopards. Contrary to the initial meeting, he is often portrayed as a fun-loving creature and enjoys drinking games, often with Grishmak, king of the wolf folk and Olememnon, the consort of Elemnestra and Olympia, the Basileas of the Hypolitan. His Tharina is Krisafitsa.

=== Queen Thirrin Freer Strong-in-the-Arm Lindenshield, Wildcat of the North, Taker of the Hand of Bellorum ===
Thirrin is the scion of the ruling house of Lindenshield. Although her father wishes for her to be well-learned, she hates the classroom, and would often rather be out training with the Housecarls. She has wild red hair like her father and bright green eyes. At the beginning of the novel, she is thirteen years old; shortly after the novel begins she turns fourteen at Yule and is proclaimed the heir of the throne. Lady Theowin was worried that the Polypontian empire was getting restless, and she was right. A werewolf comes and is first to warn them that the Empire's army has invaded. During one of her hunting outings, a bear badly wounded one of her soldiers and a storm starts up. Oskan Witch's Son, later known as Oskan the Warlock, gives them shelter in his cave. Oskan is a healer among other things and can understand wolf-folk speech. They become good friends, and later she goes on a journey with him to make allies. They first go to the Vampire King and Queen, and the Vampires reluctantly agree. She then goes to the Hub of the World to make an alliance with Tharaman-Thar, ruler of the giant Snow Leopards that live there. She is one of the main characters in the story.

It is revealed in the second book of the Icemark Chronicles, Blade of Fire, that Oskan and Thirrin do marry and together have five children: Cressida, Cerdic, Eodred, Medea, and Charlemange (Sharley).

=== Their Vampiric Majesties ===
Their Vampiric Majesties (also known as The Vampire King and Queen) are the undead Vampire monarchs of the Land-of-the-Ghosts. A deep-seated hatred and distrust has created a rift between them and the Icemark. However, because of the nature of the Empire, they agree to send aid to the Icemark.

The Vampire King and Queen appear reluctant to keep up their end of the treaty, but in the end, they help fight the Polypontians in The Blade of Fire. Their forces proved extremely useful against the Empire's flying craft, but eventually leave the fight when the Vampire King is killed by treachery. Yet the Vampire Queen miraculously returns after regrouping her forces in the Land of the Ghosts. In The Last Battle of the Icemark, Sharley figures out that His Vampiric Majesty has developed a soul, and soon after Her Vampiric Majesty develops a soul, she joins His Vampiric Majesty in the afterlife, the only vampire with a peaceful passing.

=== Holly King and Oak King ===
Oak King is the ruler of the Great Forest in the summer, while the Holly King is the ruler during the winter. Thirrin first meets the Holly King when she goes back to check on her injured stable hand. Thirrin then meets the Oak King when she was being attacked by the Polypontian on the way of finding refuge from their greatest allies, the Hypolitan. During the end of the war, the Holly King and the Oak King join the battle against the Polypontians.

== Blade of Fire ==
=== Archimedo Archimedes ===
Archimedo Archimedes is an engineer hired to improve the Icemark's defences. He has a very sour attitude towards everything. It is revealed that he only helps the Icemark because he feels as a vital assistance. He comes up with a way to counter the flying craft of the empire, and bomb shelters to protect the defenders.

=== Cressida Aethelflaed Elemnestra, Strong-in-the-Arm Lindenshield, Striking Eagle ===
Cressida Lindenshield is the oldest daughter of Thirrin and Oskan and heir to the Icemark throne and has the red hair and green eyes of her mother. She is very bossy and regal, so much that her brothers, Eodred and Cerdic, temporarily avoid her. She saves the army with King Grishmak when Scipio Bellorum sets up a trap for Thirrin, and Medea causes her (Thirrin and her army) to fall for it. After Cerdic's death, however, she and Eodred end up making up. She appears to be immune to magic, as her sister Medea found out. In the final book, Cressida marries a commander called Leonidas

=== Cerdic and Eodred Thor-hammer Strong-in-the-Arm Lindenshield ===
Cerdic & Eodred are the fun-loving twin sons of Thirrin and Oskan. Cerdic is killed in battle against the Polypontians, and Eodred drops into a deep depression. Seemingly nothing could cause Eodred to become happy, but he meets Growlahowl (nicknamed Howler) and develops a quick friendship.

=== Charlemagne Athelstan Redrought Strong-in-the-Arm Lindenshield, Prince Regent of the Exiles, Shadow of the Storm ===
Charlemagne, known as Sharley, is Thirrin and Oskan's crippled youngest son and has the green eyes and red hair of his mother. At a young age, he contracted polio, and was saved by Oskan, although his leg was crippled as a result. Charlemagne resents his injury, and when he is named Prince Regent of the Exiles, he takes advantage of the chance to prove himself. In the desert lands, with the help of Crown Prince Mekhemet, he trains as a warrior. He is given a scimitar with emeralds embedded into the handle. Mekhemet and Sharley then embark on a mission to make an alliance with Ketshaka, Leader of the Lusu. They then lead an army back to the Icemark and save the country. When Sharley was charging into the battle, the flames from the burning city gleamed off his sword as if it were on fire (hence the title: Blade of Fire). In The Last Battle of the Icemark, he, Mekhemet, and Kirimin of the Icesheets get lured to the magical Plain of Desolation, halfway between the Light and Dark, by Medea. There they meet the spirit of the Vampire King and Imp-Pious, the faithful imp.

=== Prince Growlahowl ===
Growlahowl, or Howler as Eodred first started calling him, is the son of Grishmak and is the crown prince of the Werewolves. Originally unappreciated by his father, Howler proves himself when he forms a fighting force with Eodred. Without really knowing it, he helped Eodred come out of mourning for his twin, Cerdic.

=== Queen Ketshaka III of Lusuland, the Great She-lion, and Mother of the Nation ===
Ketshaka is the ruler of Lusuland, which is located south of the Icemark in Arifica. She decides to help the Icemark in their struggle against the Polypontians without question. Ketshaka names Sharley as her adopted son along with Mekhmet. After the Last Battle of the Icemark, Sharley, Mekhemet, Kirimin and Impious visit Lusuland.

=== Krisafitsa Tharina ===
The consort of Tharaman Thar, Krisafitsa is actually very kind despite her large and intimidating exterior. Her ethic during the war is to keep everyone well-fed, resulting in her proposing meals.

=== Princess Medea Clytemnestra Strong-In-The-Arm Lindenshield ===
Medea Lindenshield is the youngest daughter of Thirrin and Oskan. Throughout the book, she is portrayed as beautiful and mysteriously detached from her family, and as a loner. She is deeply jealous of Sharley and turns traitor on her family, helping the Polypontian army in secret. When given the choice between Light and Dark she chooses Dark. She attempts to murder Sharley on more than one occasion and her actions lead to her brother Cerdic's death. Her father eventually discovers her betrayal and banishes her to The Circle Of Dark. She returns in The Last Battle Of The Icemark more powerful and with the aid of her grandfather Cronus but is destroyed, due to Oskan's sacrifice.

=== Olympia Artemision, Basilea of the Hypolitan ===
Olympia became the leader of the Hypolitan following the death of her predecessor in battle. She is described as having the face and voice of an eagle and being extremely beautiful. Olememnon eventually falls in love with her, and they are married. She is killed with Olememmnon by Erinor's horde.

=== Prince Mekhmet Nasrid, Sword of the Desert, Beloved of the One ===
Mekhmet is the crown prince of the Desert Kingdom. After meeting Sharley, he quickly befriends him and helps Sharley to become a warrior by making him do dance lessons with the dance master to strengthen his weak leg and he gives him battle training. He also gives Sharley a black horse and black armour to match. He chooses a sword for him but he doesn't know it is actually the Blade of Fire. He agrees to help defend the Icemark against the Polypontians, and gathers a giant army to stop the Imperial invasion and helps Sharley get an alliance with the Lusu, a warlike people that border the Desert Kingdom.

=== Sulla and Octavius Domitian Lycurgus Bellorum ===
The sons of Scipio Bellorum, Sulla and Octavius are especially vicious. Sulla commands the Polypontian Artillery, and Octavius commands the cavalry. Sulla kills Cerdic in the battle of the Asgard Cut. They are eventually killed in battle by Cressida and Sharley.

== Last Battle Of The Icemark ==
=== Erinor Basilea of the Southern Hypolitan ===
Erinor leads her hordes to try to take over the collapsing Polypontian Empire. She is a radical of the Hypolitan and believes all men are of a lower kind and worth nothing more than to serve their wives, and belong to their mothers until they are married, in which they belong to their wives. She also believes she is the direct messenger of the Goddess and must sacrifice to her in order to win the war, sacrificing her favorite puppy when she was eight and her beloved husband before the final battle. It is unknown to her that she was really being guided by Cronus, who abandoned her once she had served the purpose of distracting the Icemark while he invaded the physical realms, leaving the arrogant military commander he left behind to be killed by Thirrin.

=== Cronus, The Arc-Adept & King of the Darkness ===
Oskan's father and Medea's grandfather, Cronus rejected the Goddess's love and was banished to the Dark. He conquers the Icemark while most of the warriors are fighting Erinor. He is destroyed by Oskan's sacrifice because although he pretended as though he felt nothing, he secretly loved his son.

=== Titus, Emperor of the Polypontian ===
Titus is only about eight years old. He became emperor after his mother died in childbirth, and his father committed suicide. After Oskan's sacrifice, Thirrin looks after him. He is perceived as Romulus Augustus, the last emperor of Rome, who ruled the Roman Empire as a child.

=== Kirimin, Princess of the Icesheets ===
Kirimin is the youngest daughter of Tharaman-Thar and Krisafitsa and a good friend of Sharley and Mekhmet.

=== Lucretia and Belisarius ===
The twin children of Their Vampiric Majesties, presumably created by The Vampire King in the spirit realms via magic (vampires cannot conceive naturally) or by the feelings of Their Vampiric Majesties, during the two-year interval between the end of Blade of Fire and Last Battle of the Icemark. They may have been named after Lucrezia Borgia and Belisarius.

=== Imp-Pious ===
An imp who befriends Kirimin, Sharley, and Mekhemmet when they are stranded in a trap that Medea created through magical means to kill Sharley. He manages to discover love and friendship and ends up playing a vital role in helping Icemark defeat Cronus, Medea, and their powerful army of Ice Demons from destroying the physical realms.

== Prince Of The Icemark ==
=== King Edward Lindenshield ===
Edward Lindenshield is the King of the Icemark, who is killed in battle against an army of Vampires and Werewolves

=== White Annis ===
White Annis is a white witch who lives in a cave in The Great Forest. She is the eventual mother of Oskan Witchfather.

=== Cadwaladar ===
Cadwaladar is a cat who is a warrior that spends its time-fighting werewolves and vampires.

=== Thirrin's Mother ===
Thirrin's mother is a Shield Maiden of the Hypolitan. Her name is unknown. Redrought will tell the tale of how King Redrought met Thirrin's mother.
