= Medea (The Icemark Chronicles) =

- The Icemark Chronicles character
- Medea as portrayed on the US Cover
- First appearance: Blade of Fire
- Last appearance: Last Battle of the Icemark
- Created by: Stuart Hill

In-universe information
- Alias: Princess/Dark Witch/Adept
- Species: Human/Wise One
- Gender: Female
- Title: Princess Of The Icemark
- Occupation: Witch
- Family: Oskan (Father), Thirrin (mother), Cressida (Sister), Cerdic, Eodred, Charlemagne (Brothers)
- Relatives: Redrought (Grandfather), Cronus (Grandfather)
- Nationality: The Icemark

Medea Clytemnestra Strong-In-The-Arm Lindenshield is a fictional character and the chief antagonist from Stuart Hill's fantasy trilogy of books called The Icemark Chronicles. She appears in a major role in both Blade of Fire and Last Battle of the Icemark. She does not appear in The Cry of the Icemark as it is set 20 years previously to the other novels.

== Plot ==
=== Overview ===
Medea is the second youngest child (youngest daughter) of Queen Thirrin and Oskan Witchfather. Her full name is Medea Clytemnestra Strong-In-The-Arm Lindenshield. She is 15 years old. She has an elder sister, Crown Princess Cressida (17), a pair of elder twin brothers, Cerdic and Eodred (16) and a younger brother, Charlemagne (14). She is part of the royal family of the Icemark and is a princess. She is a descendant of the Wise Ones (the fallen immortal spirits and angels banished from the spirit realms to the Darkness).

=== Blade of Fire ===
Medea is looking out of her window from her tower room and brooding over the fact that her parents, who are marching home from The Ice Troll Wars will greet the rest of the family before her. She has a memory about how when she was sharing a nursery with Sharley when she was younger Sharley had broken a toy horse. She had fixed it for him, using magic, before making him tearfully watch as she broke it again. Throughout the course of the book, it is revealed that she is deeply jealous of her younger brother because of the attention and love he receives because of his withered leg that resulted from his bout with polio.

Medea tries to get Sharley killed by magically having a Greyling Bear attack him while hunting.

Oskan passes on his magic abilities by teaching Medea, as she is the only inheritor of his gifts. But Oskan is worried that Medea is drawn to The Circle Of Dark, the most dangerous plain of the Spirit Realms. Medea tries to kill Sharley by creating a magical storm when he sent away from The Icemark.

Oskan takes Medea on a diplomatic mission to The Land-of-the-Ghosts. While there Oskan reveals the true evil nature of the Dark to Medea and that his father lives in the realm. Medea is disappointed when she discovers that she can't access the Dark through the Vampiric Majesties.

Back home Medea spells the minds of the Icemarks' command and starts poisoning the family from within so they walk into a trap by The Polypontian forces. She does this in retaliation for her brother Cerdic being mean to her. Cerdic dies in the battle. This is when Medea decides to become evil and walk the paths of The Dark.

Cressida tries to get Medea to help with the war but to no avail. This is when she discovers Cressida is immune to magic so she cannot harm her.

When Sharley returns to the Icemark with an army to help her invaded country she tries to kill him by possessing Mekhmet but is defeated with the help of the Blessed Women. Then she tries to kill him with magically drawn lightning from the sky. Oskan deflects this back at her and banishes her to The Circle Of Dark.

=== Last Battle of the Icemark ===
Medea returns two years later where she has survived the torments of the Darkness and joins forces with Cronus, the Arc-Adept of The Darkness.

In order to obtain her right to be considered part of the Dark realm Medea has to do battle with the six adepts were banished from Paradise with Cronus (a character based on Lucifer). Medea defeats them in a magical battle.

Medea lures Sharley, Kirimin and Mekhmet into The Plain Of Desolation. While they are trapped there she tries to kill them numerous times using methods such as Elephantas, Trolls on bridges and ghosts. She has a battle with her father in spirit form there.

Oskan confronts Medea in The Darkness and they have a magical battle. Just as Oskan is about to destroy Medea's powers, Orla distracts Oskan allowing Medea to burn Oskan to the bone. Cressida comes and manages to wound Medea because she is immune to magic. With Medea wounded Oskan then rescues Sharley, Mekhmet and Kirimin from The Plain Of Desolation.

Medea casts aside her physical form and becomes a being of pure spirit and literally immortal.

While The Icemark is distracted with battle with Erinor and her Hordes in Romula, Medea and Cronus along with an army of Ice Demons invade the Icemark. The Vampire Queen and her army hold them at bay until Oskan and the witches transport the allied forced of The Icemark and Polypopntus back. While the allies defeat the Ice Demons. Oskan battles Medea and Cronus. Oskan is killed by the two of them but because there is a loophole that if one adept kills another they love they must pay the appointed cost and so they suffer dissolution.

== Appearance ==
Medea is described as small and slender. She is portrayed as beautiful. She has long black hair, deathly pale skin and black pupilless eyes. She wears long-sleeved dresses.

== Personality ==
Medea has an odd personality. Medea is a vindictive, selfish girl who resents her siblings and sees them as having more of her parents' love then herself. She is dark, cold-hearted and mysterious. She is mainly quiet but is intelligent and cunning. She is detached from everyone and feels no compassion for anyone or anything. She has no friends and never wishes to socialise with her family. She prefers to spend her time locked in her tower room where she feels safest. When she does join her family she is locked in a deep and brooding silence. She blames her family for her loneliness. She has great trouble communicating her needs and her feelings. She chooses to become evil rather than good as those with magical ability inherited from the Old Ones must make that choice. She thinks that she is misunderstood and blames others for her own evil nature.

== Character Origins ==
As with a lot of Stuart Hill characters, Medea is based upon a character from history. She is based upon Medea from Greek mythology who was a cunning, evil sorceress. Her middle name of Clytemnestra, as with her forename is based on another character from a Greek tragedy. It also bears a heavy resemblance to Thirrin's late aunt Elemnestra. Her surname Lindenshield is named after a Viking shield made of linden wood.

== Abilities ==
Medea's magical ability is first discovered when she is a child. It is weak at first and merely consists of predicting what they will have for dinner and making a mouse materialise across her bed but by 14 her powers have grown strong.

Medea has the ability to manipulate matter and create lifeforms from it.

Medea is a weather witch. She can create storms and draw lightning from the skies. She counters the lightning so it doesn't burn her with a blood-freezing arctic cold.

She also has a far-seeing ability allowing her to see across the ocean though it is limited. Her far-seeing is a lot stronger than her father's that can barely make it to the eaves of the forest.

She has mind-shielding ability that is second to none.

She also has the power of possession and the ability to travel in the Spirit Realm in spirit form.

In Last Battle Of The Icemark her abilities are almost limitless. The most notable addition to her armoury is the ability to shapeshift. She does this three times; once into Cronus, once into a Fire Wraith and once into a giant eagle. She also has acquired the ability to freeze time.
