= Eugene Lavrenchuk =

Ukrainian theater director

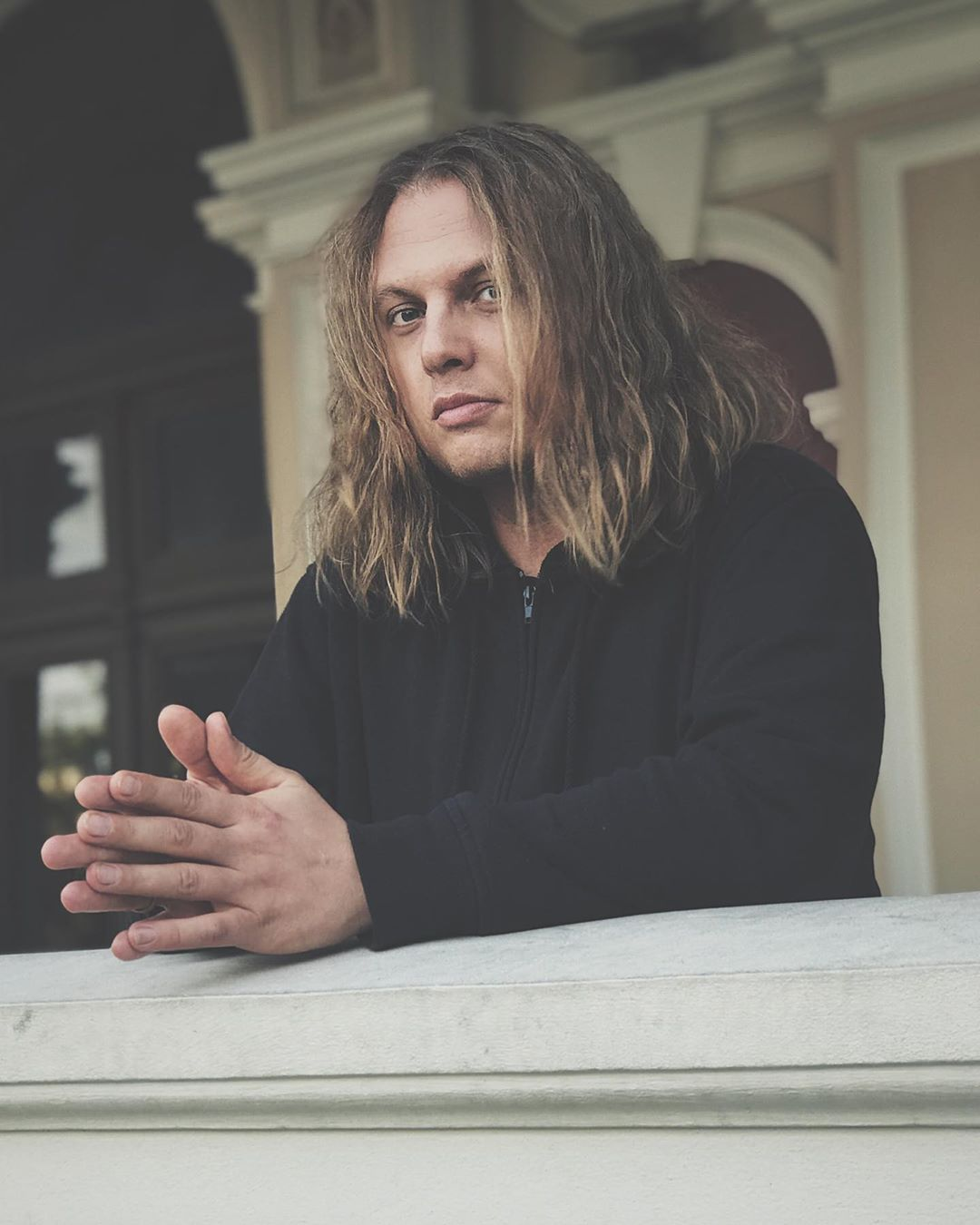
- Born: 24 June 1982 (age 44); Lviv, Ukrainian SSR, Soviet Union
- Occupations: opera and drama director producer teacher
- Years active: 2002 – presents
- Awards: Merited Artist of Ukraine
- Website: www.lavrenchuk.com

Eugene Lavrenchuk (Ukrainian: Євген Вікторович Лавренчук; born 24 June 1982) is a Ukrainian opera and drama director, producer and teacher. Director, co-founder (2002), and artistic director of the Polish Theatre in Moscow (2002–2014) and the School of acting and directing. Chief director of the Odesa National Opera House (2018–2021). Rector of the First Ukrainian School of Theater and Cinema (2018), Founder and Head of the Expert Council of the All-Ukrainian Opera Forum. Has staged more than 30 plays (performances-list). Makes productions and also carries out active teaching work in Ukraine, Poland, Germany, Lithuania and Israel. The author of the methodology of teaching acting skills and directing. Merited Artist of Ukraine (2021).

== Biography ==
He was born in 1982 in Lviv (Ukraine).

His first impressions of the theater came in the sixth grade, when his grandmother took him behind the scenes of the Lviv Theater named after Maria Zankovetska during the rehearsal process — the director Alla Babenko was working on the performance Médée by Jean Anouilh.

Fluent in Ukrainian, English, Polish, Hebrew, Russian and French. He is color blind and vegan, actively popularizes veganism and vegetarianism.

=== Education ===
He graduated from the Polish school named after Maria Magdalena in Lviv.

In 2003 he graduated from the Russian Academy of Theatre Arts (Roman Viktyuk's workshop) as an opera director, later – higher courses of choreography at the Maria Curie-Skłodowska University (Lublin, Poland), Higher Courses for directors of feature films (Moscow).

=== Polish Theater in Moscow ===
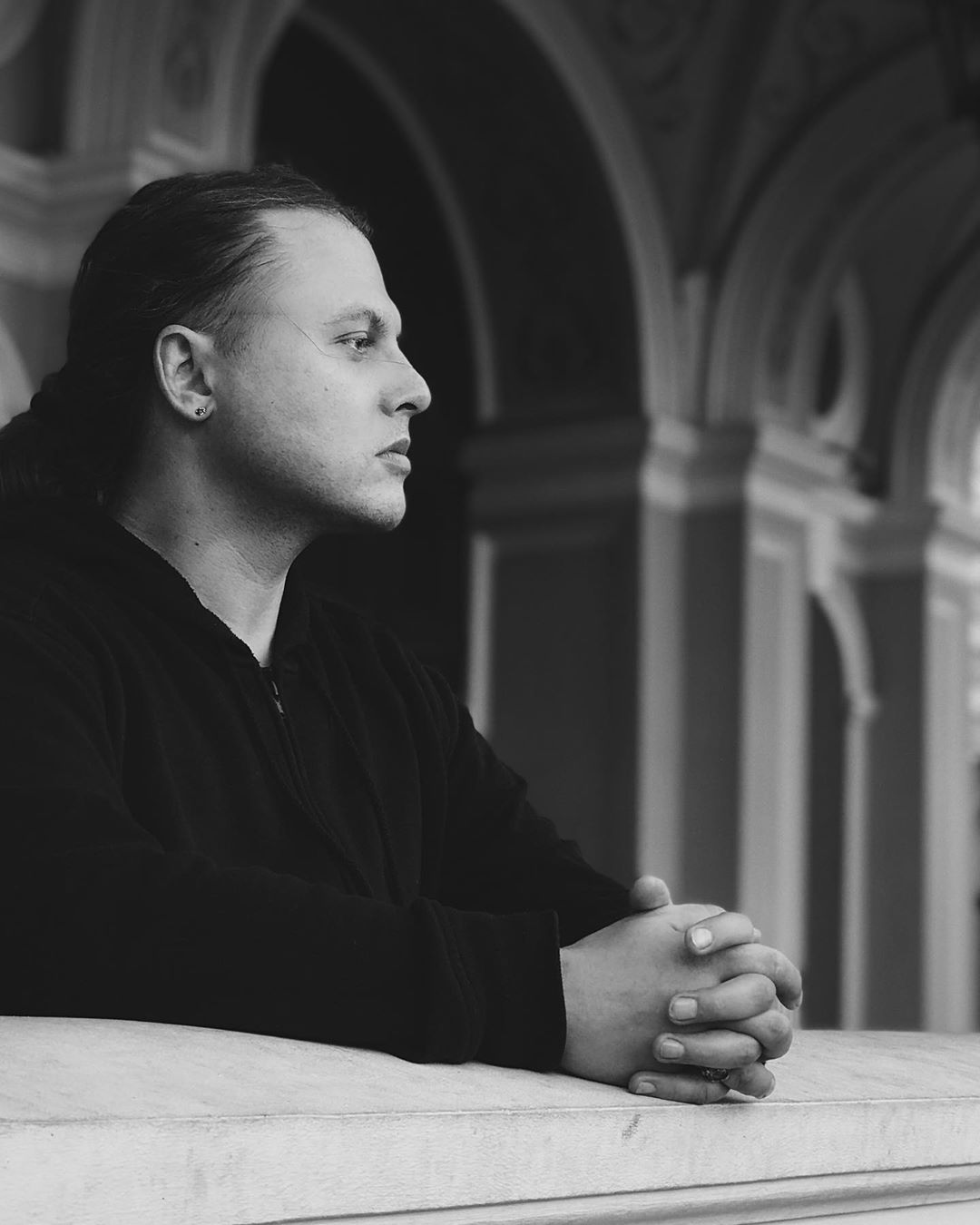

In April 2003, the premiere of the play Snow based on the play by the Polish playwright Stanislaw Przybyszewski was held on the stage of the Moscow theater Et cetera on Novy Arbat – the degree project of Eugene Lavrenchuk, a graduate of the directing faculty of the Theater Academy. Poles of Moscow Roman Yadzinsky (Bronka), Antony Fontanov (Tadeusz), and Volodymyr Terpugov (Kazimierz) played on the stage together with professional actress Yelena Boldina. At the same time, the play was considered as an exam work – the head of the examination board, People's Artist of the USSR Yelena Obraztsova was present, and she signed director's diploma of Eugene Lavrenchuk. Polish Theater in Moscow counts down its activity from the performance Snow.

The legal registration of Eugene Lavrenchuk's Polish Theater in Moscow took place in 2004. The concept of creation declared that the theater does not perform plays every day, it has no plans for the number of productions per year, and they do not tend to vulgarize creativity and check harmony with market algebra. The language of the performances was declared as Polish, Russian and any other acceptable for the performers. Major international funds, the governments and ministries of Poland and Russia, grants from the budget of Moscow, Warsaw and European programs were mentioned among the sources of funding for the theater, which allows theater projects to have a fundamentally non-commercial character.

After the play Snow by Przybyszewski, the theater's repertoire included performances of Maria Stuart by Juliusz Słowacki to the music of Gaetano Donizetti, Yvonne, Princess of Burgundy based on the play by Witold Gombrowicz, Tango by Slawomir Mrozek, The Kidnapping of Europe staged by Eugene Lavrenchuk basing on his author's script. In addition, productions by other directors were released: Romeo and Juliet based on William Shakespeare, Decline of Europe, Oedipus Sleeping.

The performances of the Theater were shown on the stages of Moscow, the Russian cities of Vologda, Tomsk, Lithuanian Vilnius, Polish Warsaw, Szczecin, Kraków, Ryażew, Świnoujście, Wrocław, Sopot and others. The theater actively participated in international theater festivals.

Participation of the Polish Theater in festivals:

- 2003 – 5th World Festival of Theaters of the Polish Diaspora in Subcarpathia (Ryaszów, Poland)
- 2008 – Theatrical Festival of the Polish Theater in Stara Prokhovnia (Warsaw, Poland)
- 2011 – International Theater Festival V World Meetings of the Polish Stage (Vilnius, Lithuania)
- 2012 – International Polish festival of mono performances MONOWschó (Vilnius, Lithuania)
- Shakespeare Festival[pl] (Gdańsk, Poland)
- Maria Konopnytska Festivals (Przedbuzh, Poland)

In 2010, Eugene Lavrenchuk International Foundation was founded in Warsaw

An important direction of the theater's work is educational programs and acting training for actors of Moscow theaters and students of theater universities. The School of Acting and Directing worked at the theater, regular author training for personal growth was held, Polish language courses and a theater studio for children were opened.

In connection with the events of 2014 (Russian armed invasion of Crimea and the war in Eastern Ukraine), Eugene Lavrenchuk left Russia as a sign of disagreement with the state's policy, which he called criminal. The theater stopped its work in 2015.

=== Eurovision 2017 ===
In May 2017, at the invitation of the Pershyi TV (Ukraine), he worked as the creative director of the Euroclub and the director of the Fan zone at the Eurovision Song Contest 2017, which was held in Kyiv.

On the eve of the Eurovision Song Contest 2022 final, he took part in the live broadcast of the Stozhary.ua project with opera star Maria Maksakova and art critic Kostiantyn Doroshenko.

=== Educational activity ===
Carries out active teaching activities both in Ukraine and Europe.

Since January 2015, he has been a teacher at the Royal Academy of Business and Diplomacy (Polish: Krolewska Akademia Biznesu i Dyplomacji we Wrocławiu; Wroclaw, Poland).

Since 2018, he has been the rector of the First Ukrainian School of Theater and Cinema. The school is open, students can be representatives of different age groups with different degrees of preparation (from elementary to professional).

School students regularly appear on professional stages, where they demonstrate their achievements to the public.

Every year, the Eugene Lavrenchuk School holds seasonal field workshops in the largest cities of Ukraine (Lviv), Poland (Warsaw, Kraków, Zakopane, Gdańsk, Sopot, Wrocław, Świnoujście etc.), where interested students from Ukraine come together with students from Poland and other European countries.

The school's curriculum and trainings are based on Lavrenchuk's own teaching methodology, which uses new interpretations of the ideas of Michael Chekhov, Jerzy Grotowski, Antonin Artaud and Konstantin Stanislavski, and also has an author's course Everything about Character. The Typology of Personality.

=== Odesa National Opera House ===
Formation

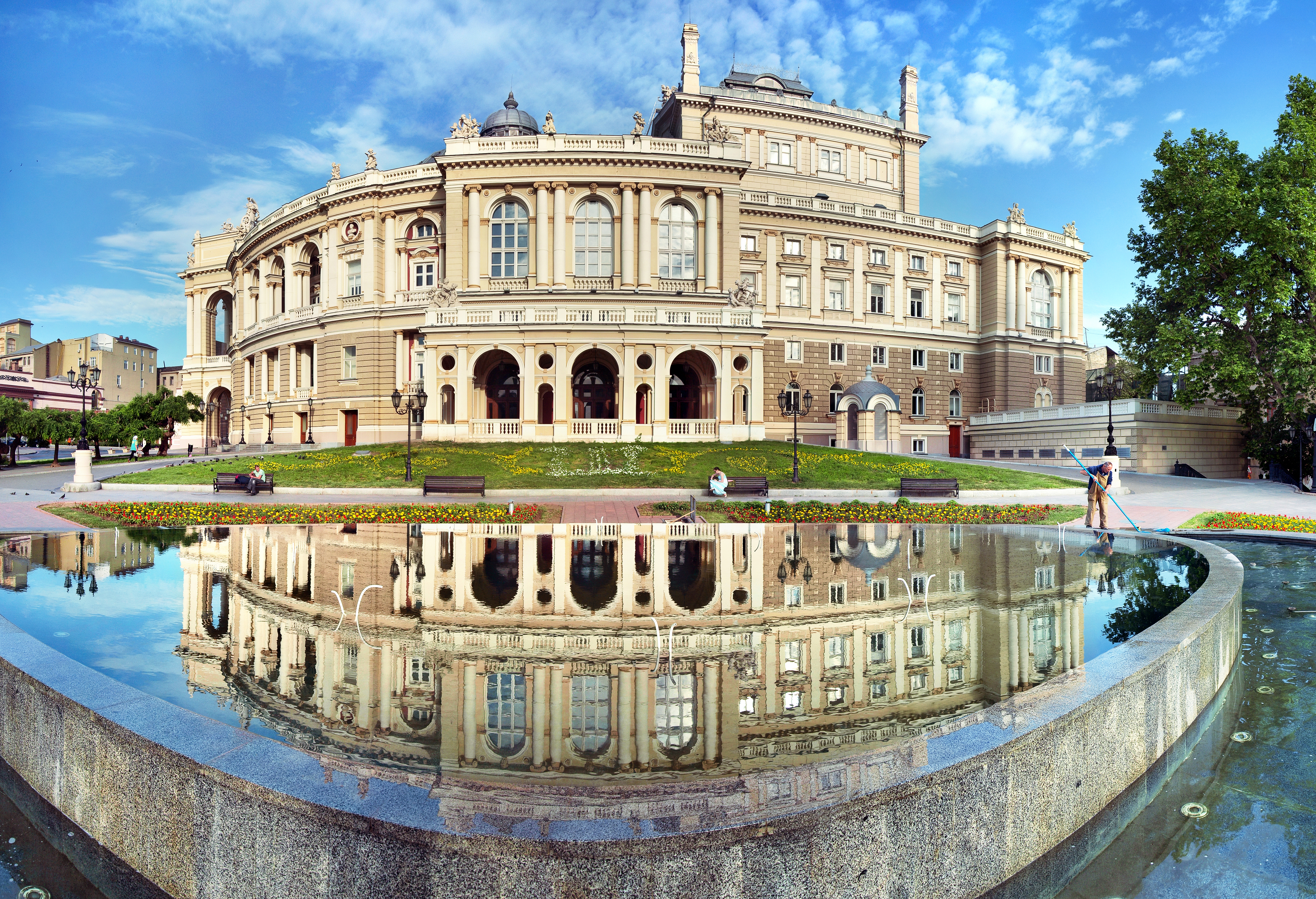
Odesa Opera and Ballet Theatre (view from the park)

On 2 March 2018 he won the competition to fill the vacant position of chief director of the Odesa Opera and Ballet Theatre. He took the position of chief director of the opera theater at the age of 36. He headed the Fund of the Odesa National Opera.

He began his work as a director by conducting training for artists: not only for soloists, but also for choir artists. He made education an integral part of the life of a professional theatrical team.

In the Odesa Opera during the time of Lavrenchuk's leadership, practical steps towards theater marketing and management appear, a vector for opera direction is taken through musical education and the ability to read scores. Lavrenchuk illustrates this thesis with Verdi's paradox in the duet Libiamo ne' lieti calici from the second scene of the first act of the opera La traviata: It says about public expression, when people say banal words and sing for joy, but Verdi puts two pianos and very careful intonations. This is the only moment when the main male character declares his love for the main female character. They remain alone, but there is untruth between them: fake orchestra sounds, bassoons and clarinets, that is, musical instruments from the mind, not from the heart. It is a paradox that people remain alone, but instead of sincerely confessing their love, they speak clichéd blanks. Instead, when the chorus sounds, everyone raises their glasses of champagne, the hero manages to quietly say I love you to the heroine so that she can hear it. Therefore, the cultural process is a combination of the artist's intimate process and open public hype. The point is to create such a multi-layered structure.

Among the realised productions are The Last Romantic based on opera works by Richard Strauss (2018), La Traviata by Giuseppe Verdi (2019). Preparations were made for the production, and the presentation of the project of the opera Dragon took place, based on the play of the same name by the Soviet playwright Evgeny Schwartz – the theme of totalitarianism in an operatic format (translation and libretto by Pavlo Arie, composer – Anton Baibakov, theater artist - Nataliya Leykina).

La Traviata

The most resonant and significant work of Eugene Lavrenchuk at the Odesa Opera was the production of La Traviata – Giuseppe Verdi's opera. All existing additions were removed from the musical part – exclusively Italian is used and Verdi's score is strictly followed. The premiere took place as part of the 210th theater season of the Odesa Opera, on 9 November 2019. For the premiere, the landing force of the world's opera elite gathered in Odesa: critics of leading profile and socio-political publications (Online Merker, Klassik begeistert, Die Bühne, L'Opera – International magazine, Neue Zürcher Zeitung, Salzburger Nachrichten, Il Tempo), management of theaters, intendants from all over Ukraine, from Rome, Venice, Hamburg, Tartu. The stage conductor was Viacheslav Chernukha-Volich. Yefim Ruakh worked on the realization of an artistic solution of the main theme of the play – the element of wind – the eternal carrying away of all and everything to nowhere. All scenery will transform and fly away. Everything will spin, and in the third act, such a whirlwind will rise that a circle of dresses will appear above the chorus, which will fly. The part of Violetta Valery was performed by soprano Alina Vorokh, Alfred by tenor Oleg Zlakoman. The poster of the performance is made in such a way that the viewer observes an X-ray picture of the Lady of the Camellias of Violetta Valery, where camellias "bloom" on her lungs. The action itself is filled with movement and stage transformations, the myth of Minos, Poseidon and Pasiphae, the metamorphoses of Zeus in love, is woven into the fabric of the play.

La Traviata gathered the press that, on the one hand, was enthusiastic about the innovative directorial work, on the other hand, there were criticisms about the dominance of visual images over the musical component of the opera. Based on the production, a video version appeared: a separately recorded audio version, to which a video sequence involving drones and a crane was shot. The publication of a book about the play "La Traviata" was announced, the title of which echoes Violetta's main aria Addio, del passato.

The work received professional recognition in the form of the Les Kurbas Prize (2020), won in the nomination Musical performance in the genre of opera/operetta/musical of the All-Ukrainian Theater Festival-Award GRA (2020), Eugene Lavrenchuk entered the short list of the Shevchenko National Prize (theatre art).

Termination of cadence

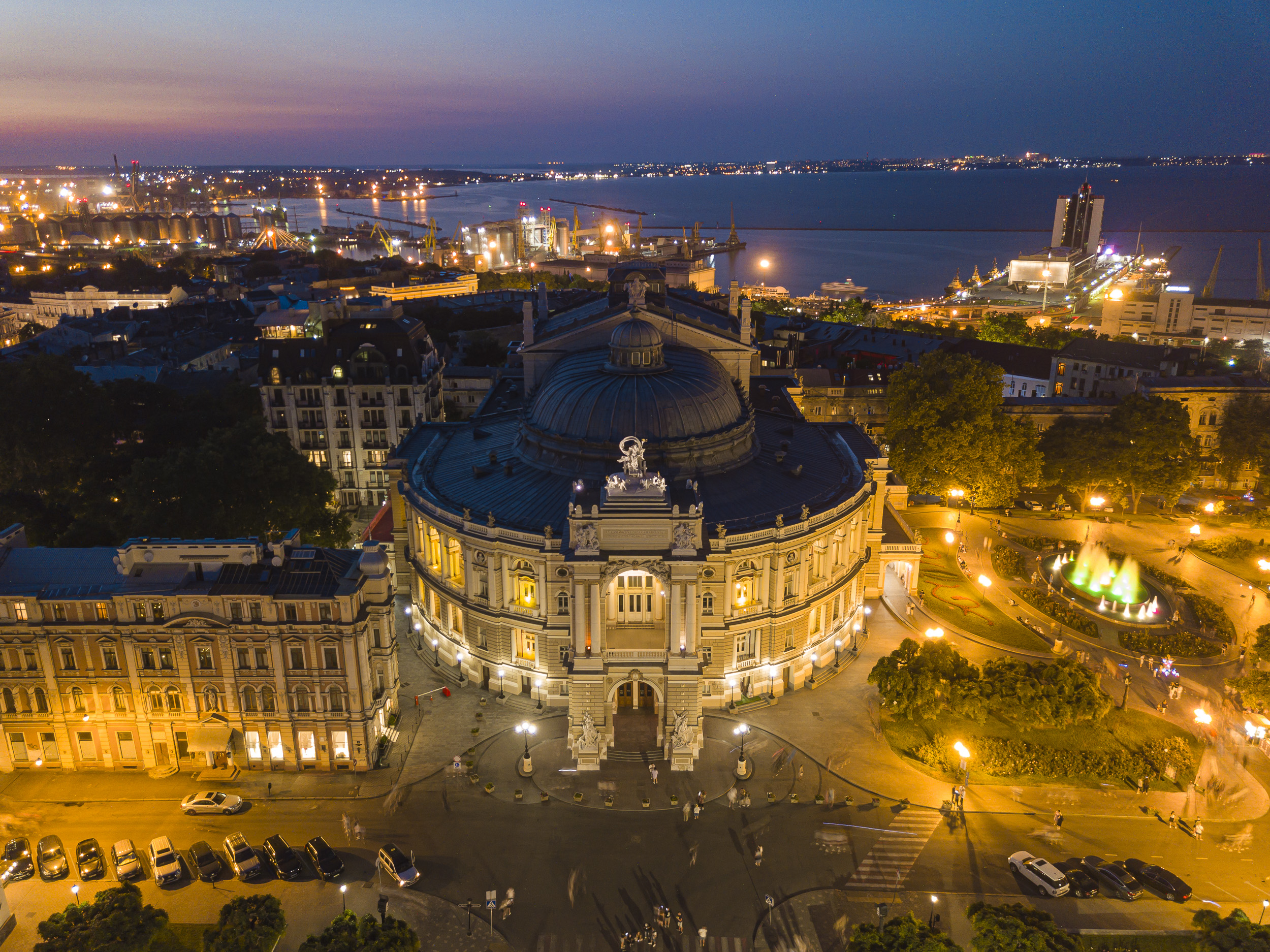
Odesa Opera and Ballet Theatre in the panorama of the city

The resonance of La Traviata and the received awards opened the way to new plans and ideas. For 2021, the staging of the modern, innovative opera Zaporozhets za Dunayem in the style of a comic strip was announced, as well as a number of other projects. But as early as on 10 February 2021, Eugene Lavrenchuk was warned by an official letter about the non-renewal of the contract from 15 March that year. On 1 March 2021, Eugene Lavrenchuk reported the attack on him in Odesa in December 2020. Unknown persons beat him on the face and head, as a result of which a cut wound was received. The Odesa Opera published its own interpretation of the story and recalled the details of last year's beating. On the same day, the Taras Shevchenko National Prize Committee of Ukraine published a statement on receipt of letters (anonymous and signed by respected artists) with appeals not to award Eugene Lavrenchuk, the chief director of the Odesa National Academic Opera and Ballet Theater, for his production of La Traviata by G. Verdi and draw attention to the fact that accusations from different, seemingly unrelated addresses contain more or less the same arguments with the same words in some places. Artists from Ukraine and abroad supported Eugene Lavrenchuk (in particular, the director of the Polish Theater in Poznań, the head of the Zbigniew Raszewski Institute of Theater Maciej Novak and others).

Summing up his work at the Odesa Opera, among the key decisions during his three years of work, which qualitatively changed the situation in the Theater, Lavrenchuk named establishing foreign policy with an expert environment, media and target audience. However, the extension of the contract for the position of the theater's chief director did not take place: Lavrenchuk submitted his candidacy for the competition for general director-artistic director of the Odesa Opera, but on the eve of the competition, on July 21, he withdrew his candidacy in an official video appeal.

=== All-Ukrainian Opera Forum ===
Eugene Lavrenchuk is the founder and chairman of the expert council of the All-Ukrainian Opera Forum, which is a central event in the field of the opera industry of Ukraine. The forum is held with the participation of managers of the major Ukrainian opera theaters, representatives of the academic community, domestic and foreign music critics, deputies and opinion leaders. Within its framework, critics' laboratories are held (curator: Professor Yurii Chekan), opera premieres, presentations of opera start-ups (curator: Eugene Lavrenchuk).

The venue is linked with a significant opera premiere. So, in 2019, it took place in Odesa, and was united with the opera La Traviata by Giuseppe Verdi, staged by Eugene Lavrenchuk at the Odesa Opera and Ballet Theatre; 2021 – in Kharkiv with the premiere of the opera Vyshyvany. The King of Ukraine by Alla Zahaikevych in the production of Rostyslav Derzhypilsky at the Kharkiv State Academic Opera and Ballet Theatre named after Mykola Lysenko.

=== Detention in Italy ===
Eugene Lavrenchuk was detained at Naples airport on 17 December 2021, at the request of Russia for extradition – allegedly, eight years ago, while working in the Russian Federation, he committed a financial offense (allegedly, Tagansky District Court of Moscow accused him of fraud, various financial frauds in the amount of 4 million rubles, and sentenced to 10 years in prison. Upon the request of the evidence base and documents, the requesting party was unable to provide anything, arguing with the preliminary investigation and request for extradition.

At the beginning of January 2022, the initiative group created a petition in support of the artist. More than 1,200 artists came out with the call Free Eugene Lavrenchuk. The statement of support was published by the PEN Ukraine and PEN A merica with the signatures of more than 50 members, by the National Union of Theater Actors of Ukraine. Personal statements were made by the head of the Lviv city community Andriy Sadovy, political activist Iryna Podolyak, public activist and writer Oleg Sentsov, journalist Yuriy Makarov and many others. By the court decision of 21 January, Lavrenchuk was sent under house arrest (the Ukrainian consulate allocated an apartment and provided all necessary things). Interpol refused the Russian Federation to extradite the detainee due to the lack of evidence of his guilt.

Eugene Lavrenchuk's detention took on a political color, and dozens of diplomats, politicians, ministers and cultural figures joined their efforts to release him. The request for release was directed by Pope Francis. The issue of the arrest was brought to the level of the Italian Parliament by Deputy Riccardo Magi. The situation was controlled by the Minister of Justice of Italy[en] Marta Cartabia[en]. A key role on the Ukrainian side was played by the Consulate General in Naples (Consul General of Ukraine in Naples Maksym Kovalenko).

On 25 March 2022, the Naples Court of Appeal rejected the Russian Federation's extradition request on the grounds that Lavrenchuk was at risk of being subjected in Russia to cruel, inhuman or degrading treatment or punishment, or [behavior] that is a violation of fundamental [human] rights, which according to Italian legislation (Article 698 of the Code of Criminal Procedure) excludes passive extradition». On the same day, a message from Eugene Lavrenchuk appeared on the social network: Friends! I am free! Finally! Thank you all very much for everything you have done for me.

In the end, all charges were dropped, and each day of illegal detention was compensated in the amount of 250 euros (paid to Italy from funds received from Russia). The mass media, which covered the process, used the wording The last victim of Russian Interpol in relation to Lavrenchuk.

=== Modern times ===
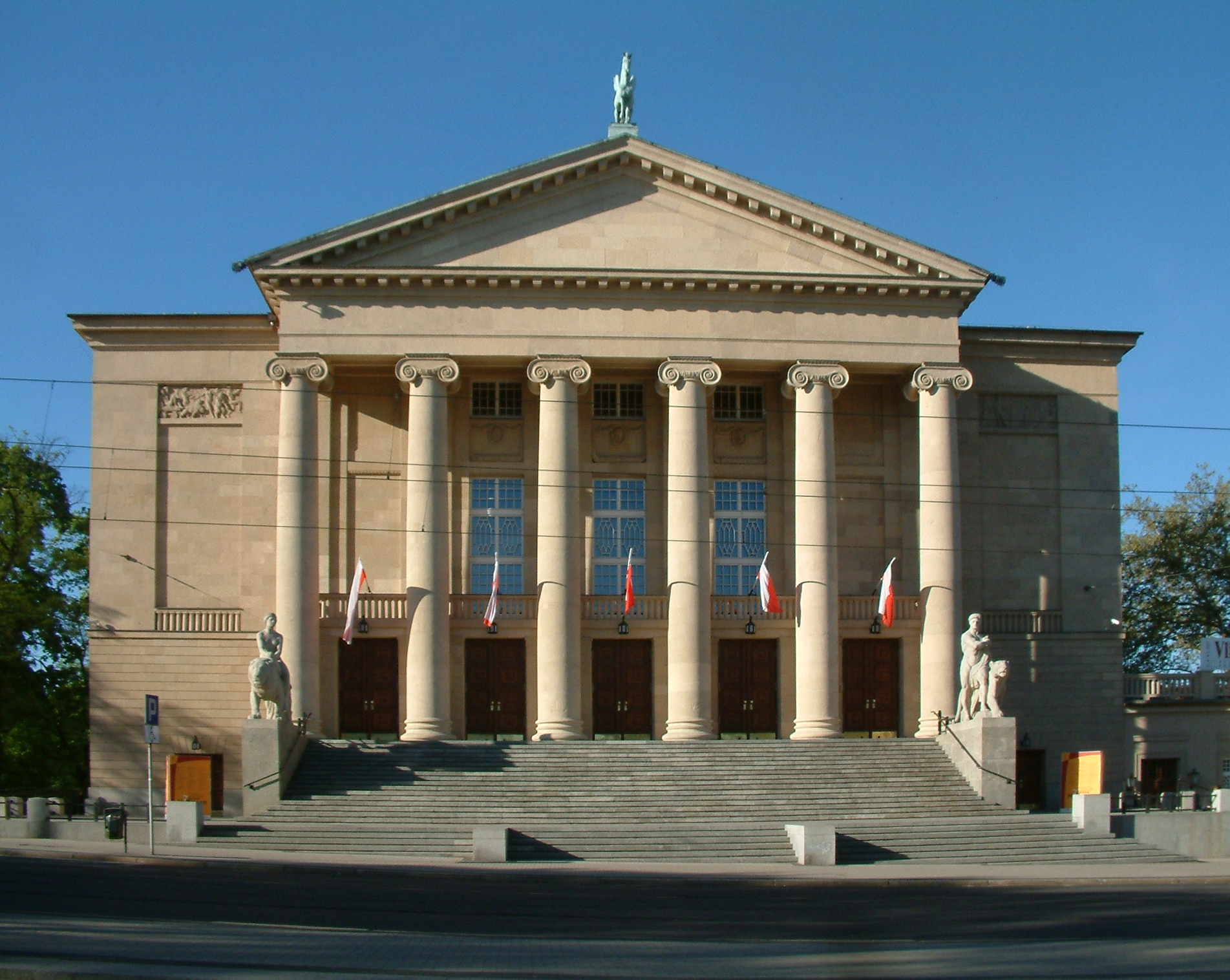
Grand Theatre, Poznań

Since June 2018, he has been an expert of the Ukrainian Cultural Foundation. Since September 2018, he is the rector of the First Ukrainian School of Theater and Cinema

The company Lavrenchuk Production acted as a partner in the production of La Traviata at the Odesa Opera in 2019, in partnership with the Odesa Theater named after V. Vasylko realized the play The Terrible Chinese Curse. Ukraine based on Elizaveta Melnychenko's dramaturgic debut in 2020.

Two operas by Giuseppe Verdi are in development: Falstaff for the Kyiv National Academic Theatre of Operetta and Rigoletto, the presentation of which took place on 7 May 2022, at New York's New Art Dealers Alliance (NADA) (the conductor is Viktor Ploskina, the artist is Mira Machina). At the stage of preparation for filming is the feature film Ulysses based on the novel Ulysses and the short film Narcissus based on his own script.

In 2022, he realized two productions on the stage of the Poznań Opera House, in collaboration with Karolina Sofulak: the operas Albert Herring by Benjamin Britten and Rusalka by Antonín Dvořák. Karolina Sofulak noted about the joint research of the score of the opera Rusalka, that this is not a simple fairy tale, but rather a parable, or an elaborate, symbolic metaphor of the insides of the human psyche. Dvořák and Kvapil, i.e. the composer and the librettist, at the end of the 19th century did not know the language developed in the following decades by Freud and then by Jung.

In 2023, he became a scholarship holder of the Ministry of Culture and National Heritage (Poland).

== The performances ==
=== Director’s works ===
Polish Theater in Moscow

- 2003 – the melodrama Snow by Stanisław Przybyszewski (diploma work. The premiere took place on the stage of the Moscow theater Et cetera on Novy Arbat)
- 2005 – anti-mystery Yvonne, Princess of Burgundy based on the play by Witold Gombrowicz (on the stage of the Moscow International House of Music)
- 2009 – the drama Tango based on the play by Sławomir Mrożek (on the stage of the V. Mayakovsky Moscow Theater)
- 2012 – the story of one madness in the classical era Maria Stuart based on Maria Stuart by Juliusz Słowacki to the music of the opera Maria Stuart by Gaetano Donizetti
- 2014 – The Kidnapping of Europe based on his own script (the premiere did not take place)

Lviv Theater of the Young Spectator

- 2004 – The Dragon Evgeny Schwartz

National Academic Ukrainian Drama Theater named after Maria Zankovetska

- 2004 – theatrical agony The Chairs Eugène Ionesco

Tomsk Regional Drama Theater

- 2004 – drama Biloxi Blues Neil Simon
- 2006 – anti-utopia Amazonia by Dmytro Glass

Lviv National Academic Theater of Opera and Ballet named after Solomia Krushelnytska

- 2005 – Cavalleria Rusticana, the opera Rural Honor by Pietro Mascagna (the premiere did not take place due to the death of the conductor-producer)

Embassy of Poland in the Russian Federation

- 2006 – Opera Ball Julian Tuvim

Odesa Regional Academic Russian Drama Theater

- 2006 – the drama Twilight of the Gods based on the play Temptations and Passions by Rodion Fedenyov
- 2008 – plastic drama Tanakshpil by Eugene Lavrenchuk based on modern Israeli prose and the Books of the Old Testament (dedication to the memory of Pina Baush)
- 2015 – Waiting List by Oleksandr Mardan

Eugene Lavrenchuk Theater School is open

- 2007–2016 – WORKSHOP – a cyclical project of reporting shows-performances of the school students (Moscow) (artistic director of the project, producer);
- 2013 – Playing Chekhov

Tomsk Theater of the New Spectator

- 2008 – pamphlet Dragon based on the play of the same name by Evgeniy Schwartz (new director's edition)
- 2010 – the drama Anna Karenina by Eugene Lavrenchuk based on Leo Tolstoy's novel of the same name

Lithuanian Theater of Russian Drama (Vilnius)

- 2009 – Lizard, Doe, Shaman and Gabriela by Alvida Bayor based on Czeslaw Milosz (a joint project of the Terra Humana Foundation (Warsaw) and five theater groups from Russia, Ukraine, Lithuania and Poland)

Eichal Tarbut Theater (Netanya, Israel)

- 2015 – Judas and his brothers based on the 1st Book of Maccabees

Odesa National Academic Theater of Opera and Ballet

- 2018 – The Last Romantic based on opera works by Richard Strauss
- 2019 – La Traviata an opera by Giuseppe Verdi

Grand Theatre (Poznań, Poland)

- 2022 – Albert Herring opera by Benjamin Britten (with Karolina Sofulak)

=== Production projects ===
Polish Theater in Moscow

- Romeo and Juliet William Shakespeare
- The Decline of Europe (artistic director of the project, author of the script, producer)
- Oedipus Sleeping (artistic director of the project, producer)

Tomsk Theater of the New Spectator

- 2010 – Passion for Beckett. Waiting for Godot based on the play by Samuel Beckett; dir. Sergey Ozerny (author of the idea, producer)
- 2010 – Parents and children: ordinary fascism; dir. Ryshat Gali (author of the idea, producer)

Odesa Regional Academic Russian Drama Theater

- 2016 – The Beautiful Cuckold based on the play of the same name by Fernand Crommelinck; dir. Olga Menshikova (artistic director of the project, producer)
- 2016 – Notes of a Madman based on the novel of the same name by Mykola Gogol; dir. Igor Nevedrov (artistic director of the project, producer)
- 2016 – Blizzard by Maryna Tsvetaeva; dir. Ryshat Gali (artistic director of the project, producer)
- 2016 – Decameron based on the novels of Giovanni Boccaccio; dir. Vladimir Butakov (artistic director of the project, producer)

Odesa Academic Ukrainian Music and Drama Theater named after V. Vasylko

- 2020 – A Terrible Chinese Curse. Ukraine by Elizaveta Melnychenko; dir. Boris Kryvets (producer)

=== Dramaturge ===
Grand Theatre (Poznań, Poland)

- 2022 – Rusałka opera by Antonin Dvořák; dir. Karolina Sofulak

== Special feature of productions ==
The impressions of the sixth-grader, who got to the theater from the entry for personnel, when all the curtains were lifted, revealing the dilapidated walls, were so strong that Eugene Lavrenchuk continued to look for these dilapidated walls, going to the performances of various theaters, and did not find them, because they were covered by the wings. In memory of this emotion, the director uses in his productions the technique of missing "stage clothes", when the bare walls of the theater are illuminated by specially installed devices, and he calls the very fact of the presence of a theater curtain in a modern theater obscene.

== Awards and recognition ==
- 2004 – Exhibition Scene of Russia – gold medal, Jubilee of the Year and Youngest director of the year titles
- 2013 – Honorary award For services to Polish culture – for outstanding achievements in the field of culture and science (decision of the Minister of Culture of Poland Bogdan Zdrojewski)
- 2016 – Higher title in the field of art – Prominent cultural figure of the State of Israel (Mitstayen bemeyuhat be Tarbut Israeli) – by the decision of the Commission of the Ministry of Culture of Israel
- 2020 – Laureate of the Les Kurbas Prize (for staging the opera La traviata) – for the first time in history this prize was awarded for an opera production
- 2020 – Third All-Ukrainian Theater Festival-Award GRA (Kyiv) – opera La Traviata – winner in the nomination Musical performance in the genre of opera/operetta/musical
- 2020 – Award of the daily all-Ukrainian newspaper The Day — Crown of the Day – for the effectiveness of creative striving in the field of the Ukrainian opera theater
- 2021 – Merited Artist of Ukraine
- 2021 – Shortlist of Taras Shevchenko National Prize of Ukraine in the category of theater art
