= Scream (theater) =

Theater in Dnipro, Ukraine

Coordinates: 48.4628°N 35.0471°E

Kryk (theatre)
- Крик (театр)
- Founded: 1987 (studio); 1989 (theatre) registered 6 July 1990
- Type: Academic municipal theatre
- Website: theater-krik.com

Kryk (lit. Scream) — officially the Dnipro Academic Ukrainian One-Actor Theatre "Kryk" — is a theatrical institution in the city of Dnipro, Ukraine. It is considered the only full-value one-actor theatre of its kind in Ukraine, in which a single individual simultaneously performs the roles of actor, director, screenwriter, set designer, visual artist, music editor, make-up artist, and costume designer. That person is the theatre's founder, People's Artist of Ukraine Mykhaylo Melnyk.

In November 2012, the theatre was granted academic status by order of the Ministry of Culture of Ukraine.

== History ==
=== Origins (1987–1989) ===
The precursor to the One-Actor Theatre was the theatre-studio "Kryk," founded by Mykhailo Vasylyovych Melnyk at the Dnipropetrovsk Assembly College in 1987. Melnyk combined his acting and directing work at the Taras Shevchenko Dnipro Academic Ukrainian Music and Drama Theatre with artistic direction of this college studio, whose performances gradually gained great popularity among the townspeople. In December 1989, Mykhailo Melnyk officially opened the theatre-studio "Kryk" in what was then the Komsomol Glory Museum named after Oleksandr Matrosov (Cathedral Square, Dnipropetrovsk). Due to the absence of funding, Melnyk personally constructed the audience benches, stage curtains, and all lighting and sound equipment by hand. In the early performances, there were only 15–20 spectators, and if fewer than twelve audience members attended, the performance had to be cancelled. Rumours spread through Dnipropetrovsk of a tall, handsome young man who walked the streets handing out invitations to his theatre, speaking exceptionally pure Ukrainian and engaging freely with passersby while maintaining artistic dignity. Already during this first period, with productions of Haidamaky and Propashchi ("The Lost"), "Kryk" performed not only within Ukraine but also in other republics of the former Soviet Union.

=== Registration and recognition (1990–1995) ===
The Dnipropetrovsk theatre-studio "Kryk," as a municipal cultural institution, was officially registered by resolution of the executive committee of the October District Council of People's Deputies of the city of Dnipropetrovsk on 6 July 1990 (District Council Resolution No. 293 of 06.07.1990).

By order of the Dnipropetrovsk City Council dated 4 May 1993, Resolution No. 471r, the theatre-studio was renamed and re-registered as the Ukrainian One-Actor Theatre "Kryk" (Registration No. 5498 of 04.05.1993).

In 1991, the theatre made its first tour to Lviv with the production Haidamaky. The following year it toured Kyiv, performing at the Young Theatre. In 1993, Melnyk staged Lolita, based on Vladimir Nabokov's novel, which he performed for sixteen years before eventually withdrawing it from the repertoire. As the artist later explained, he began to feel uncomfortable performing the role in front of his own daughter and decided to replace the piece.

In 1994, Mykhailo Melnyk was awarded the honorary title of Honoured Artist of Ukraine.

=== Move and academic status (1996–present) ===
In 1996, Melnyk became the first-ever laureate of the Les Kurbas Prize and the laureate and Grand Prix winner of the theatrical festival-competition for the highest theatrical award of the Prydniprovya region, "Sicheslavna-1996." In the same year, "Kryk" relocated to new premises — the Architects' House, where the theatre continues to operate to this day. Since 1996, the Academic Ukrainian One-Actor Theatre "Kryk" has leased space on the ground floor of the Dnipro Architects' House at 1 Mykhaila Hrushevskoho Street (formerly Karl Liebknecht Street). By Resolution No. 42/22 of the Dnipropetrovsk City Council dated 31 October 2007, the cultural institution was renamed the Communal Cultural Institution "Dnipropetrovsk Municipal Ukrainian One-Actor Theatre 'Kryk'." In November 2012, by order of the Ministry of Culture of Ukraine, the theatre was granted academic status. In December 2019, Mykhailo Melnyk was awarded the title of Honorary Citizen of Dnipro at a ceremony held on 19 December 2019, coinciding with the theatre's 30th anniversary.

== The founder and sole actor ==
Mykhailo Melnyk (born 18 May 1957 in the village of Beieve-Komuna, Sumy Oblast) graduated from the Kyiv State Institute of Theatre Arts named after Karpenko-Karyi in 1982. From 1982 to 1989, he was an actor at the Taras Shevchenko Dnipropetrovsk Ukrainian Theatre. He is a People's Artist of Ukraine (2005), Honoured Artist of Ukraine (1994), and Laureate of the National Prize of Ukraine named after Taras Shevchenko (2007). A defining characteristic of the theatre is that Melnyk is simultaneously its actor, director, screenwriter, set designer, visual artist, music editor, make-up artist, and costume designer — all in one person. The performances are not staged on a bare platform but make full use of scenographic, musical, and lighting elements of contemporary theatre. The theatre has attracted a devoted following particularly among young people in Dnipro: students attend performances ten to twenty times each and consider it an honour to shake the actor's hand. Creative meetings between Melnyk and young poets, writers, students and local journalists have become an important attraction of the theatre.

== Notable production: Sin (Hrikh) ==
One of the theatre's most celebrated productions is Sin, based on the works of the classic Ukrainian writer Mykhailo Kotsiubynsky — Intermezzo and What Is Written in the Book of Life — which premiered in 2004. The story of a son who sends his own mother to her death has left no spectator unmoved; the otherworldly "voice of the mother," a creative device of Melnyk as director, reportedly makes even the most cold-blooded viewers shudder. In 2007, for this production, Mykhailo Melnyk was awarded the Taras Shevchenko National Prize of Ukraine — the highest creative distinction in Ukraine, awarded for an outstanding contribution to the development of culture and the arts.

== Repertoire ==
Over the course of its existence, the theatre has staged fourteen productions. As of 2017, five mono-performances are represented in the active repertoire. The full list of productions is as follows:

Title	Ukrainian title	Source work	Years performed
Haidamaky	Гайдамаки	Based on the poem by Taras Shevchenko	1986–1993
The Lost	Пропащі	Based on works by Ostap Vyshnya	1989–1991
Punishment	Кара	Based on Nikolai Gogol's Taras Bulba	1991–1997
Lolita	Лоліта	Based on the novel by Vladimir Nabokov	1993–2009
Perfume	Парфумер	Based on the novel by Patrick Süskind	1995–2006
Gates of Paradise	Ворота раю	Based on the story by Jerzy Andrzejewski	1998–2003
Ukrainian Hunt	Українське полювання	Based on works by Ostap Vyshnya	1999–2002
Mollis	Моліс	Based on Fyodor Dostoevsky's A Gentle Creature	2002–2013
Sin	Гріх	Based on Intermezzo and What Is Written in the Book of Life by Mykhailo Kotsiubynsky	2004–present
Mutation	Мутація	Based on works by Fyodor Dostoevsky	2007–2015
Taboo	Табу	Based on Leo Tolstoy's The Kreutzer Sonata	2009–present
The Sun in Your Eyes...	Сонце в очах твоїх...	Original musical contact-performance	2010–present
Unrecognized	Непізнані	Based on Stefan Zweig's Letter from an Unknown Woman	2013–present
Wild	Дикий	Contemporary original production	2020s–present

== Awards and recognition ==
- Winner, Festival "Theatrical Prydniprovya-89," for the mono-performance Haidamaky
- 2nd Prize, Festival "Theatrical Prydniprovya-91," for Kara
- 1st Prize, Festival-competition "Sicheslavna-1994"
- Honoured Artist of Ukraine (1994)
- First-ever laureate of the Les Kurbas Prize (1996) Grand Prix, "Sicheslavna-1996"
- People's Artist of Ukraine (2005)
- Taras Shevchenko National Prize of Ukraine (2007), for the production Sin Best Direction, "Sicheslavna-2004"
- Order of the Ukrainian Orthodox Church of Prince Volodymyr the Great, 3rd degree Honorary Citizen of Dnipro (December 2019)

== Location ==
Since 1996, the theatre has been located on the ground floor of the Architects' House, at 1 Mykhaila Hrushevskoho Street (formerly Karl Liebknecht Street), Dnipro, Ukraine.
