= Nicole Chevalier =

American operatic soprano

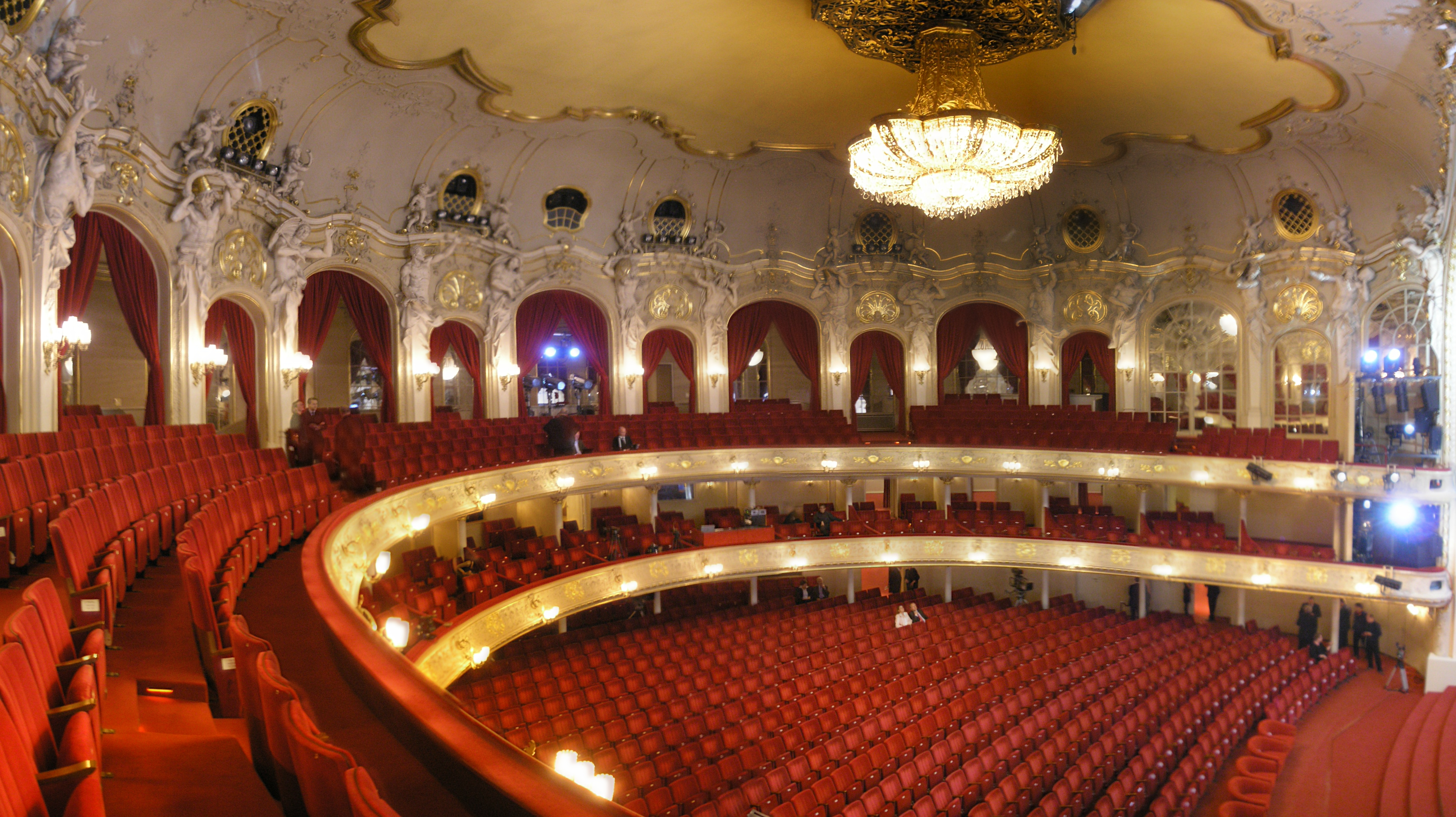
- Interior of Komische Oper Berlin, where the soprano has worked from 2012
- Born: Chicago
- Education: Indiana University; Juilliard School
- Occupation: Operatic soprano
- Organizations: Theater Freiburg; Staatstheater Kassel; Staatsoper Hannover; Komische Oper Berlin
- Awards: Der Faust

Nicole Chevalier is an American operatic soprano, who debuted at the renowned Salzburg Festival in the summer of 2019. She was a member of the Komische Oper Berlin, and has been a freelance artist since 2017. Her repertoire includes bel canto as well as Mozart heroines such as Verdi's La Traviata, Donizetti's Maria Stuarda and Lucia di Lammermoor, Mozart's Konstanze in Die Entführung aus dem Serail, Elettra in Idomeneo, and stretches till Aribert Reimann's Medea. In 2016, she was awarded the German National Theatre prize Der Faust for all four female characters in Offenbach's Les Contes d'Hoffmann.

== Career ==
Born in Chicago, Illinois, Chevalier studied at the Northwestern University and at the Indiana University Bloomington, music and voice with Virginia Zeani, and also acting and literature. During that time, she appeared in university productions, in roles such as Lauretta in Puccini's Gianni Schicchi, the First Niece in Britten's Peter Grimes, and Rosalinde in Die Fledermaus by Johann Strauss. She graduated with a diploma in 1998, and continued her voice studies at the Juilliard School with Trish McCaffrey. She performed the title role in Carlisle Floyd's Susannah. She took master classes with Martina Arroyo, Joan Dornemann, Renata Scotto and Giorgio Tozzi, spending the 2000/01 season in Italy, including the festivals La Piccola Scala in Milan and the International Opera Festival in Rome.

Chevalier was a member of the Theater Freiburg from 2003 to 2007. Her roles there included Iphise in Jean-Philippe Rameau's Dardanus, Ilia in Mozart's Idomeneo, the Countess in his Le nozze di Figaro, Fiordiligi in his Così fan tutte, staged by Max Färberböck, Adina in Donizetti's L'elisir d'amore and the title role in his Maria Stuarda. In contemporary music, she collaborated with André Richard of the SWR's Experimentalstudio für elektronische Musik (Experimental studio for electronic music) and with Jean-Baptiste Barrière of IRCAM in Paris, appearing as Clémence in Kaija Saariaho's opera L'Amour de loin.

She was a member of the Staatstheater Kassel from 2007 to 2009. Her roles there included Alice Ford in Verdi's Falstaff, Donna Elvira in Mozart's Don Giovanni, Iole in Handel's oratorio Herkules, Blanche in Poulenc's Gespräche der Karmelitinnen, Angèle Didier in Franz Lehár's Der Graf von Luxemburg, and in the title role of Donizetti's Lucia di Lammermoor. She often sang in concert, including a recording of Verdi's Messa da Requiem.

She was a member of the Staatsoper Hannover from 2009 to 2012, where she appeared as Micaëla in Bizet's Carmen, as the First Lady in Mozart's Die Zauberflöte, as Marie in Donizetti's Die Regimentstochter, and again as his Lucia. In the 2011/12 season, she performed Violetta in Verdi's La Traviata for the first time. Her performance, staged by Benedikt von Peter, won her a nomination for the German theatre prize Der Faust.

Chevalier was a member of the Komische Oper Berlin from 2012 to 2017 where she performed roles such as the title role in Handel's Semele, Bernstein's Cunegonde (Candide), Donna Elvira (Don Giovanni), Fiordiligi (Così fan tutte), Tytania (A Midsummer Night's Dream), Rosalinde (Die Fledermaus). In 2016, she performed all female heroines (Stella/Olympia/Antonia/Giulietta) in Offenbach's Les Contes d'Hoffmann, staged by Barrie Kosky. In 2017, she appeared in the title role of Aribert Reimann's Medea.

== Awards ==
Chevalier was awarded the theatre prize Der Faust 2016 in the category "Sängerdarstellerin/Sängerdarsteller Musiktheater" (singing actor in musical theatre) for the roles in Offenbach's Les Contes d'Hoffmann.
