= The Golden Fleece (trilogy of plays) =

Trilogy of plays by Franz Grillparzer

- Original title: Das goldene Vließ
- Original language: German
- Written by: Franz Grillparzer
- Genre: Tragedy

Premiere
- Date: 26–27 March 1821
- Place: Burgtheater, Vienna

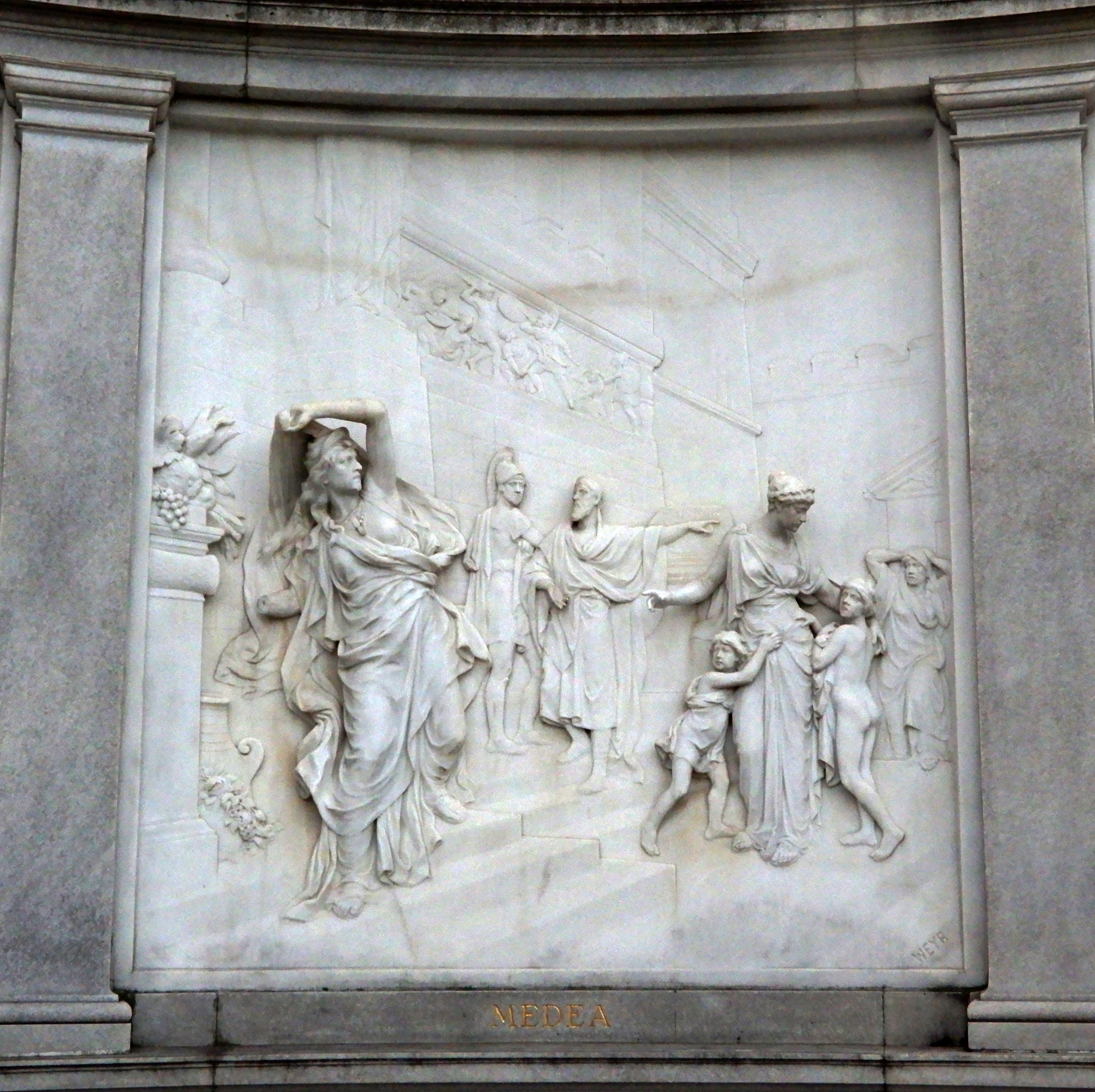
A scene from Medea on the Grillparzer Memorial in Vienna

The Golden Fleece: A Dramatic Poem in Three Parts (German: Das goldene Vließ. Dramatisches Gedicht in drei Abteilungen) is a trilogy of tragedy plays by the Austrian writer Franz Grillparzer, consisting of The Guest-friend (German: Der Gastfreund), The Argonauts (German: Die Argonauten) and Medea. It is based on the Greek myths of Jason, the Argonauts and Medea. Grillparzer's major sources were the Argonautica by Apollonius of Rhodes and Medea by Euripides.

The three plays were first staged at the Burgtheater in Vienna on 26 and 27 March 1821. Medea was published in English translation in 1879 and the entire trilogy in 1942.

== Adaptations ==
- Aribert Reimann's 2010 opera, Medea, is an adaptation of the third play in Grillparzer's trilogy.
- In 1897, a Yiddish New York theatre troupe staged Jacob Gordin's adaptation of the third play in Grillparzer's trilogy. Gordin updated Grillparzer's drama to the reign of Antiochus IV, and rewrote Medea as a Jewish woman.

== See also ==
- Cultural depictions of Medea
