= Marco Arturo Marelli =

Swiss set designer and stage director (born 1949)

- Born: 21 August 1949 (age 76); Zürich, Switzerland
- Education: Kunstgewerbeschule Zürich
- Occupations: Set designer; Opera director
- Organizations: Nationaltheater Mannheim
- Awards: Berliner Kunstpreis; Reumert Prize
- Website: marco-arturo-marelli.de

Marco Arturo Marelli (born 21 August 1949) is a Swiss set designer and stage director who has worked at European opera houses for opera and ballet. He designed sets for ballets by John Neumeier, and for premieres of the operas Thomas Chatterton by Matthias Pintscher at the Semperoper in Dresden (1998) and Medea by Aribert Reimann at the Vienna State Opera (2010).

== Career ==
Born in Zürich on 21 August 1949, Marelli trained at the Kunstgewerbeschule Zürich to be a graphic designer. He assisted several set designers at the Wiener Volksoper and the Vienna State Opera, including Günther Schneider-Siemssen. August Everding engaged him in 1973 as an assistant of Toni Businger the Staatsoper Hamburg. Marelli created there sets for the ballet company of John Neumeier.

From 1974, Marelli worked as a guest at the Theater Hagen, the Staatstheater Darmstadt, and at the Oper Frankfurt for stage directors Alfred Kirchner and Harry Kupfer. He also designed sets for the Komische Oper Berlin and the Theater am Goetheplatz in Bremen. From 1981, he also directed the operas for which he designed the set, beginning with Mozart's Die Zauberflöte at the Staatstheater Mainz. He was an Oberspielleiter at the Nationaltheater Mannheim in the 1984/85 season.

He has collaborated with his wife, the costume designer Dagmar Niefind, on productions at the Deutsche Oper Berlin, Paris Opéra, the Théâtre du Châtelet in Paris, the Liceu in Barcelona, the Finnish National Opera in Helsinki, the Houston Grand Opera, at the Royal Opera House in London, the Teatro Real in Madrid, in Strassburg, the Nationaloper in Tokyo and in Triest. They worked together for the premiere of Aribert Reimann's Medea at the Vienna State Opera in February 2010, conducted by Michael Boder.

Marelli was awarded a Danish Reumert Prize in 2009. He was made an honorary member of the Vienna State Opera in 2010.

== Work ==
Marelli created stage sets, and from the early 1981s also directed the following operas:

- 1975: Mozart – Die Zauberflöte
- 1979: Gottfried von Einem – Dantons Tod, directed by Peter Brenner
- 1979: Janáček – Její pastorkyňa, directed by Alfred Kirchner
- 1981: Puccini – Madame Butterfly, directed by Harry Kupfer
- 1981: Frederick Delius – Romeo und Julia auf dem Dorfe, directed by Kurt Horres
- 1981: Mozart – Die Zauberflöte
- 1983: Johann Christian Bach – Amadis de Gaule
- 1986: Hans-Jürgen von Bose – Die Leiden des jungen Werthers
- 1986: Verdi – Don Carlos
- 1987: Mozart – Così fan tutte
- 1988: Mozart – Don Giovanni
- 1989: Mozart – Le nozze di Figaro
- 1992: Hans Werner Henze – Der Prinz von Homburg
- 1992: Ligeti – Le Grand Macabre
- 1993: Richard Strauss – Capriccio
- 1994: Hindemith – Cardillac
- 1995: Franz Schubert – Des Teufels Lustschloß
- 1995: Verdi – Simon Boccanegra
- 1995: Wagner – Tristan und Isolde
- 1996: Jules Massenet – Werther
- 1996: Richard Strauss – Die schweigsame Frau
- 1997: Verdi – Falstaff
- 1997: Wagner – Der fliegende Holländer
- 1997: Mozart – Così fan tutte
- 1997: Frank Martin – Le Vin herbé
- 1998: Matthias Pintscher – Thomas Chatterton (premiere)
- 1999: Strauss – Ariadne auf Naxos
- 2000: Puccini – Gianni Schicchi
- 2000: Schönberg – Die Jakobsleiter
- 2000: Mozart – Die Zauberflöte
- 2000: Strauss – Die schweigsame Frau
- 2000: Mozart – Die Entführung aus dem Serail
- 2001: Bellini – La sonnambula
- 2003: Verdi – Falstaff
- 2004: Debussy – Pelléas et Mélisande
- 2007: Weber – Der Freischütz
- 2010: Aribert Reimann – Medea (premiere, Vienna / Frankfurt)

== Literature ==
- Christoph Albrecht (musicologist, born 1944) (ed.): Marco Arturo Marelli – Ich höre den Raum. Arbeiten für die Oper des Regisseurs und Bühnenbildners. Henschel Verlag, Leipzig 2010, ISBN 978-3-89487-666-1.
