= Les Kurbas Prize =

Ukrainian theatrical art award

The Les Kurbas Prize is an award of Ukraine in the field of theatrical art, established in 1995 by the Ministry of Culture and the National Union of Theater Actors of Ukraine in honor of the Ukrainian director, actor, theater theorist, and playwright Les Kurbas.

== Laureates ==
- Eugene Lavrenchuk
