= Blade of Fire =

2007 novel by Stuart Hill

- Cover
- Author: Stuart Hill
- Cover artist: Gary Blythe (US) Mark Edwards/Carol Lawson (UK)
- Language: English
- Series: The Icemark Chronicles
- Genre: Fantasy novel
- Publisher: The Chicken House
- Publication date: 2007
- Publication place: United Kingdom
- Media type: Print (hardback)
- Pages: 574 pp
- ISBN: 0-439-84122-4
- OCLC: 77742500
- Preceded by: The Cry of the Icemark
- Followed by: Last Battle of the Icemark

Blade of Fire is a 2007 fantasy novel, the second in British author Stuart Hill's fantasy series, the Icemark Chronicles.

== Plot ==
Blade of Fire takes place 20 years after the first novel. The story follows Thirrin's and Oskan's (now married) new efforts to repel the imposing threat of Imperial invasion, yet again at the hands of Scipio Bellorum and his bloodthirsty sons, Octavius and Sulla.

But this time, they have the help of their five children: Cressida, the Crown Princess and military extraordinaire; Eodred and Cerdic, the twin warrior princes; Charlemagne (Sharley), stricken with polio at a young age, and much to his chagrin, cannot be a warrior; and finally Medea, the dark daughter and the only inheritor to her father's gift.

A burning hatred for Charlemagne causes Medea to turn against her family. Early on in the book Oskan has a prophecy about Sharley. About a week or two later Sharley is sent off into exile to be Prince Regent to the exiles. Maggie, his tutor, goes with him. He is sent to the Southern Continent where he makes some unexpected allies and friends. This includes the Desert People (he befriends the Sultan's son) and the Lusu people of Arifica.

Maggie falls ill on the journey to the Sultan's palace and is sent to stay in oasis where he recovers. On the journey to Lusuland, an unexpected storm comes but the spirits of the desert (the blessed women) save them from harm. On the sea voyage back to Icemark the fleet of Lusu people and the desert people are attacked by the Empire's biggest allies.

Then before the final battle against the Polypontians, Medea possesses the Crown Prince of the desert people, Mehkmet, and turns him against Sharley. With the help of the Blessed Women though, Medea is defeated. Later when Oskan is about to call down lightning, Medea steals his lightning and is about to use it against Sharley but Oskan blocks the lightning, sending it back toward Medea. Oskan attacks Medea because he found out that Medea betrayed the Icemark and banishes her to the seventh plain of the magical realms called The Circle Of Dark.

Octavius is killed by Sharley and Sulla is killed by Cressida. After the battle, Scipio is beheaded by Thirrin and the Vampire Queen rips apart his body. Icemark has defeated the Empire.

== Reception ==
Blade of Fire received mixed reviews.

According to The Times, "Hill is great at battle-scenes, and his benign werewolves and vampires are a pleasing twist on the legendary monsters." Books For Keeps noted that "Hill is ingenious in his use of real historical figures and societies as the basis of fantasy."

However, The Times wasn't over-enthusiastic about the sequel. Kirkus Reviews called Blade of Fire "a huge (in every way) disappointment", referring to it a "bloated sequel" that bogs down a tale terrific at its core in a mire of uninspired subplots, unnecessary explanations and predictable set pieces".
