= Medea (Reimann) =

Opera by Aribert Reimann

- Opera by Aribert Reimann
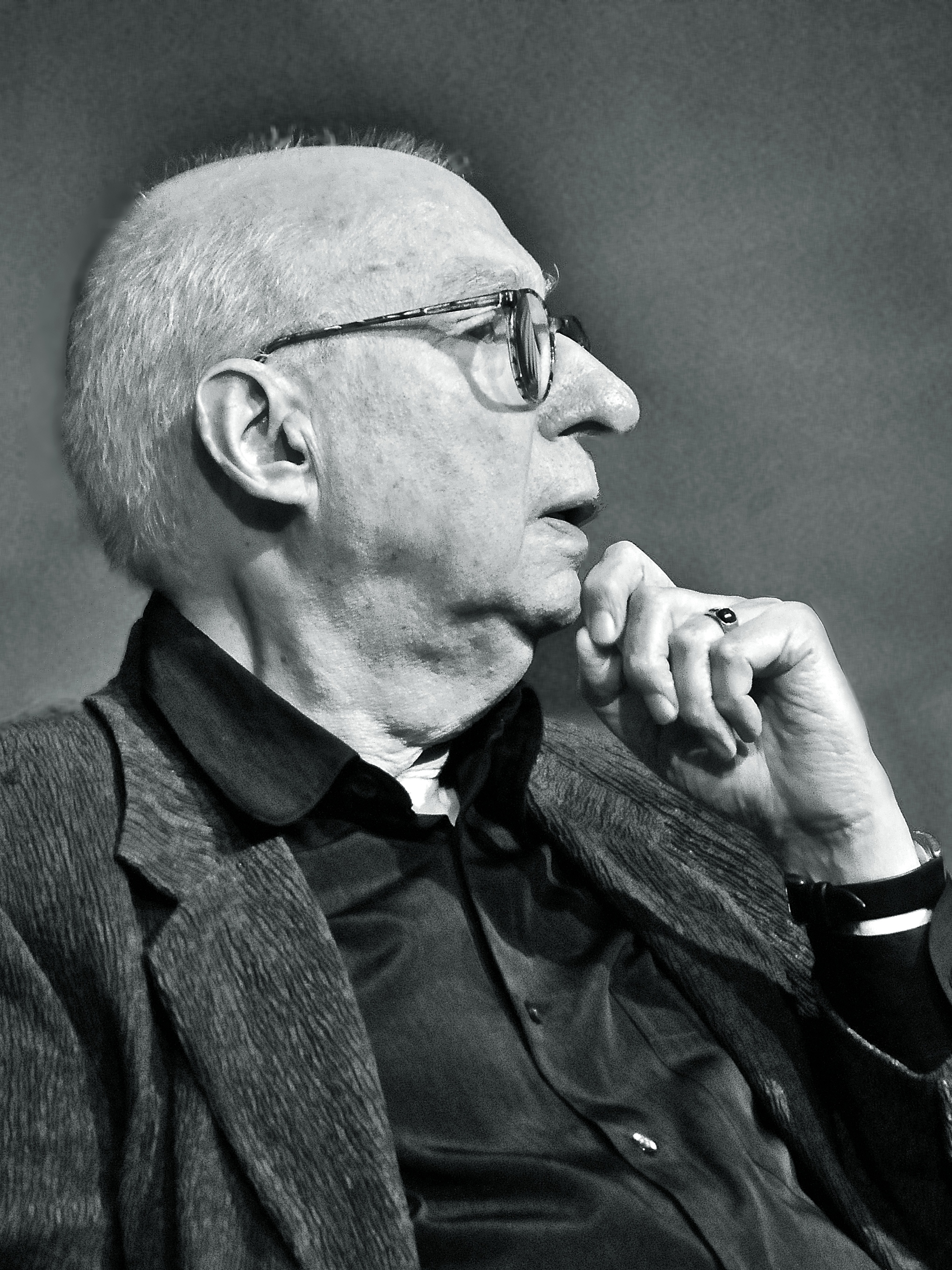
- The composer in 2010
- Language: German
- Based on: Medea by Franz Grillparzer
- Premiere: 28 February 2010; Vienna State Opera

Medea is a German-language opera by Aribert Reimann after the play by Franz Grillparzer. It was premiered at the Vienna State Opera in February 2010. The German premiere was at the Oper Frankfurt in August 2010.

== History ==
Aribert Reimann had already written seven literary operas, including Melusine, Lear and Troades, when he received a commission from the Vienna State Opera to write an opera for the conclusion of the era of Ioan Holender as General Director of the opera house. He chose the play Medea by Franz Grillparzer as a basis for the work, the last part of Grillparzer's trilogy Das goldene Vlies (The Golden Fleece) which is focused on Greek mythology and based on the Argonautica by Apollonius of Rhodes and Medea by Euripides.

The opera was successfully premiered at the Vienna State Opera in February 2010, staged by Marco Arturo Marelli, conducted by Michael Boder, with Marlis Petersen in the title role. The German premiere was at the Oper Frankfurt in August 2010.

== Roles ==
Role	Voice type	Premiere cast, 28 February 2010 Conductor: Michael Boder
Medea	coloratura soprano	Marlis Petersen
Kreusa	mezzo-soprano	Michaela Selinger
Gora	contralto	Elisabeth Kulman
Kreon	tenor	Michael Roider
Jason	baritone	Adrian Eröd
The Herald	countertenor	Max Emanuel Cenčić

== Music ==
Grillparzer showed Medea as a foreigner without protection who becomes the victim of powerful men, a view of the tragedy appealing to Reimann. In a production at the Komische Oper Berlin, staged by Benedict Andrews with Nicole Chevalier in the title role, Medea is shown as a barbarian woman, a stranger to the society and therefore expelled.

A reviewer of the premiere noteds that the vocal lines are highly ornamented, full of melisma, and with sharply jagged contours ("wild gezackt, scharf geschnitten"), demanding virtuosity from the singers. The metre changes without rest, also in the orchestra. The strings are divided multiple times, while the winds often have solo function. The vocal style was described as highly artificial ("hochartifiziell").

== Recordings ==
- DVD (cast of the premiere): Marlis Petersen, Michaela Selinger, Elisabeth Kulman, Michael Roider, Orchestra of the Vienna State Opera, Michael Boder, 2010
- CD (cast of the German premiere): Claudia Barainsky, Tanja Ariane Baumgartner, Michael Nagy, Michael Baba, Paula Murrihy, Tim Severloh, Frankfurter Opern- und Museumsorchester, Erik Nielsen. Oehms, 2CDs 2010
