= The Cry of the Icemark =

First book in the Icemark Chronicles by Stuart Hill (2005)

- First edition
- Author: Stuart Hill
- Cover artist: Kinuko Craft/Gary Blyth & Carol Lawson
- Language: English
- Series: The Icemark Chronicles
- Genre: Fantasy novel
- Publisher: The Chicken House
- Publication date: Original: January 3, 2005 Scholastic Audio Books; Unabridged edition: June 1, 2006 Scholastic Paperbacks: April 1, 2009
- Publication place: United Kingdom
- Media type: Print (Hardback & Paperback)
- Pages: 472 pp
- ISBN: 978-0-439-68626-6
- OCLC: 57705113
- LC Class: PZ7.H55738 Cry 2005b
- Followed by: Blade of Fire

The Cry of the Icemark is the first book in the Icemark Chronicles by English author Stuart Hill. The plot revolves around thirteen-year-old princess Thirrin Freer Strong-in-the-Arm Lindenshield, as she must fight to save her small home, the Icemark, from the invading Polypontian Empire.

The novel won the inaugural Waterstones Children's Book Prize in 2005. It also won the 2006 Highlands Children's Book award for Long Novels in 2006. Fox has bought the rights to the movie. However, no release dates or production information exist.

== Plot ==
The Polypontian Empire has conquered much of the known world in recent years, much thanks to its fearsome general, Scipio Bellorum. Bellorum has finally decided to invade his small neighbor to the north, the Icemark. After King Redrought sacrifices his entire army to stop the invasion, Thirrin, his daughter, is left alone to save the nation.

Thirrin, having just made an alliance with the werewolves by saving their king, must now seek out more allies, as the Icemark and the werewolves alone cannot defeat the Empire. Although they have the support of their vassal, the Hypolitan, more are needed. Thirrin, with the aid of a young warlock, Oskan Witch's Son, must attempt to win over the Vampire King and Queen. They know this will be difficult because of the centuries of distrust and hatred between the two races. Because the Empire hates all that is unscientific and irrational, the Vampires know that if the Icemark falls, the Empire will wipe out the Vampires next. With this in mind, the Vampires reluctantly agree to send aid.

On the advice of King Grishmak of the werewolves, Thirrin and Oskan travel to the Hub of the World, to try to ally themselves with the Snow Leopards, led by Tharaman-Thar, who live there. The leopards are as tall as warhorses at the shoulder, Tharaman-Thar even bigger, and are fearsome fighters. With the threat of the Empire again winning the argument, the Snow Leopards choose to fight with Thirrin.

The combined forces of the Icemark, the Snow Leopards and the Hypolitan clash with Bellorum's forces. The werewolves have not yet arrived, as a muster of their nation takes several months. The Vampires have also not arrived, as they are stubborn, and are not reliable. While the allies fight brilliantly, the Empire's sheer numbers begin to turn the tide. After bursts of immeasurable determination, the allies manage to continuously withstand the Empire. Scipio Bellorum calls out the Allied cavalry. With immense skill and tactics, the Allies manage to continuously bring down the Empire's numbers. Bellorum, supposedly fearing the end, calls out Thirrin for single battle. Thirrin only just dodges Bellorum's killing blow, and manages to cut off his hand. The Empire's army intervene, breaking the rules of the duel. The Allies join in to protect the young queen. Bellorum is taken to safety, where he prepares for the final conquest.

As the final battle is being waged, which the allies believe will surely end in their destruction, the Werewolves, the Vampires, and many of the creatures from the Land-of-the-Ghosts finally arrive. When they arrive, Thirrin is overjoyed. They find a new strength within them to fight the Polypontion Army and defeat them. They use everything in their power to defeat them, and they succeed. In addition, the forces of the Holly King and the Oak King of the nearby forest join the war, as they have made themselves allies with Thirrin. With their numbers, and the sheer terror they inflict, the battle turns into a rout. The vampires and werewolves pursuit the enemy and kill most of the enemy's army. Bellorum and other top army officials escape.

== Characters ==
.

== Trivia ==
The Polypontian army is split into divisions, each with its own color. The black army is composed entirely of veterans and is considered the elite force of Polypontia.

The character of Thirrin is based on Stuart Hill's sister.

The Polypontian empire bears certain similarities to the historical Roman Empire; many Polyponian names resemble Roman names. For example, Scipio Bellorum's name is a combination of the Roman general Scipio Africanus and Bellum, the Latin for war, and his sons Octavius and Sulla are similarly named after Augustus, born Gaius Octavius Thurinus, and Lucius Cornelius Sulla, respectively. Further, the name "polypontian", referring to the many bridges in the empire, may reference the engineering prowess of the ancient Romans. Other evidence that supports this conclusion can be found in the history of a Celtic tribe called the Iceni that lived in what is now Norfolk, Britain and was under the control of the Roman Empire. After its king died the Empire annexed the tribes land, leading to his wife, Boudica, taking control of the tribe and revolting against the Empire. There are marked similarities between Boudica and Thirrin; bright red hair, a piercing gaze, and a certain bluntness of speech.

== The Movie ==
Fox 2000 has bought the rights to The Cry Of The Icemark movie and reported that it is currently in development. Little information is available at the current moment but what is known is that it will be produced by Courtney Pledger and the screenplay will be by Michael Hirst (The Tudors, Elizabeth: The Golden Age)

The Icemark Chronicles website has reported that the company that purchased the rights to the movie will not actually be making a film of the first book in the near future.

== Reception ==
The Cry Of The Icemark received mainly positive reviews. The Guardian described it as "a supremely satisfying read which really deserves to be called a page-turner... Hill's original and quirky approach could yet make him the proper heir to Joan Aiken's crown." The Times also gave it a good review saying, " It will have readers shivering with delight...From the moment that its 13-year-old heroine, Princess Thirrin, punches a werewolf on the nose you know you're in for a rollicking good read."
