= The Icemark Chronicles =

2000s children book series

- The Cry of the Icemark; Blade of Fire; Last Battle of the Icemark; Prince of the Icemark
- Author: Stuart Hill
- Language: English
- Genre: Fantasy
- Publisher: The Chicken House
- Published: 2005 - 2013

The Icemark Chronicles is a series of books consisting of The Cry of the Icemark, followed by Blade of Fire, and Last Battle of the Icemark and the prequel called Prince Of The Icemark. The books were written by Stuart Hill from Leicester. Fox 2000 Pictures optioned the film rights to the book. The film was set to be produced by Courtney Pledger and Sarah Radclyffe, but it is unknown if or when it will be released. The books are published by Chicken House.

== The Cry Of The Icemark ==
The Cry Of The Icemark tells the story of Thirrin Freer Strong-in-the-Arm Lindenshield, Wildcat of the North, a thirteen-year-old Princess to the land of Icemark.

Thirrin enjoys life as a carefree daughter. She is an impulsive teenager, who gets bored in the lessons that she has with an old scholar named Maggiore Totus. Her father, King Redrought 'Bear of the North', stresses that she not only is adept in the subject of fighting but has the sharp mind of a competent scholar. After troubles in an expansive forest that borders the capital of the Icemark, Frostmarris, she meets Oskan Witch's Son, a fifteen-year-old boy, with healing talents learned from his mother, a White Witch. He later becomes Royal Advisor and accompanies Thirrin throughout the story.

The Polypontian Empire, led by General Scipio Bellorum, have lost few battles, never a war, and have taken control of most of the countries around them, save Icemark and some others. They are "supposed" to improve the world with science and a better quality of life and are inspired by the Romans. It is in one of these Polypontian territorial wars that Redrought sacrifices his entire army, including himself when the last soldier kills him in a surprise attack. He does this to give Thirrin time to prepare to fight off the rest of the empire's forces, make an alliance with the Wolf Folk, evacuate Frostmarris (Capital of Icemark) before the entire Polypontian army invades. After defeating a small Polypontian army, Thirrin succeeds in reaching the Hypolitan people, an Amazon-like tribe, who were forced out of their lands for they could not live the way they wanted to, much like the exodus of the Hebrews. She is disheartened however when several Wolf-Folk spies come back with her father's dead body. As a result, Thirrin becomes Queen of the tiny northern country. She embarks on a quest to find new allies for the Icemark, resulting in alliances with the Vampires and the mythical and ferocious Snow Leopards. Later, as the harsh winter's ices begin to thaw, the Polypontian army begins to advance. Queen Thirrin's army of her own Housecarls, the Snow Leopards, the Wolf-Folk, and Vampires are waiting for them.

Thirrin and Tharaman-Thar (leader of the snow leopards) fight various battles without the help of other allies. In one fight, Thirrin's aunt dies. In another, Oskan, seeing that Thirrin is in danger, calls down lightning, which kills many Polypontian troops, but almost kills him too. Later, Oskan is healed miraculously, but for Thirrin things get harder. In one of the last battles, General Scipio Bellorum himself fights with Thirrin in a challenge, where Thirrin cuts his hand off. In the last battle, with Thirrin's army outnumbered and the Black Army (Polypontian "armies", which may be the equivalent of a corps in a modern army, are differentiated between using colours rather than numbers) arrives, Oskan, having recovered during the battle, rings a bell and calls "The allies are here." General Scipio Bellorum's army gets frightened to see unnatural people coming. The vampires and the snowy owls drink the blood of many soldiers and the were-wolves tear the soldiers apart. The Holly King and the Oak King's army arrives with their summoned creatures of the wood. Thirrin wins the battle when the Polypontian Empire flees. The story ends with the preparations for Yule, which parallels the opening.

== Blade of Fire ==
Twenty years have passed: Thirrin and Oskan have married and had 5 children. However, when war threatens the Icemark once again, their crippled son Charlemagne is sent to the South Continent as Prince Regent to the Icemark as a refugee for his and their protection. But he has no intention of acting like a good little prince and sets off to find some of the greatest allies the Icemark could hope for. He travels through deserts and is protected by the Blessed Women, spirits who vow to protect him. He arrives at the Desert Kingdom; he befriends the Crown Prince Mekhmet. Thanks to the Dance Master, he loses his disability and learns to fight. He gathers more allies such as the Lusu People and a battalion of zombies, Rock Trolls, and ghosts, proving he has inherited the ability to unite people from his mother.

Meanwhile, back in Frostmarris, Thirrin and her allies are at war with the Polypontian Empire, led by Scipio Bellorum and his two sons. This time the empire has a new weapon at their disposal - giant airships that can drop bombs hundreds of feet from the air to the ground. The Vampires arrive and battle the ships in their bat form. The war progresses, with the Sky Navy and Vampires being the key weapons of both armies. During one battle, the Vampire King engages Bellorum. The battle is of such skill and beauty that all around stop to watch its progress. When Bellorum finds himself losing, and asks the King for one last request, and gives a signal. His soldiers clear the deck of the airship, and cannons are revealed, along with muskets. These literally tear the Vampire King apart and the Vampires return to The-Land-of-the-Ghostsfor his funeral rights, led by the mourning Vampire Queen. This gives the edge back to the Empire's armies, as they still have their airships.

During the final battle, all appears to be lost when Charlemagne appears, leading his army. They tear into the Empire's flank, turning the tide of the battle. Bellorum's sons are both killed; with Charlemagne beheading Octavius, although not before he almost fatally wounds Mekhmet; and Charlemagne's sister, Cressida, impaling Sulla in the stomach. Scipio's army turns and flees, breaking their rock hard discipline. Scipio himself flees, but is hunted down by the Vampire Queen, who has returned. Thirrin takes the pleasure of killing him.

Throughout the story, Medea, the youngest daughter of Thirrin and Oskan, has been causing havoc. Inheriting the legacy and powers of Oskan, who inherited them through his father, she also has the choice between Light and Dark. She inevitably chooses the dark and begins trying to murder her little brother, Charlemagne, for "stealing" her parents' love. She uses her weather powers to create a storm and try to take out the fleet of ships Sharley is traveling with on his journey to Venezzia, hoping that the storm will kill him. Many of the ships collapse but Sharley survives. She later causes the death of her brother, Cerdic and many soldiers of The Icemark by manipulating the leaders of the allies' minds and making them go into a battle that they can't be successful in. When Sharley returns to the Icemark, she possesses his friend Mekhmet and gives Sharley the option to kill him or be killed himself. Only with the help of the Blessed Women do they both survive. Oskan realizes that a Dark Witch is causing trouble, but does not believe it is his daughter. Then, she attempts to murder Charlemagne as he "returns to the north with a blade of fire in his hand" (as stated in Oskan's prophecy). When Oskan calls down lightning from the sky, she takes it from him and directs it at Sharley. Oskan, enraged, deflects it back at her. He then shows her how strong the temptation of the Dark is on him, and how much it could heighten his own powers. Finally, he sends Medea into the realms of Dark. The book ends with Charlemagne and an old housecarl who is an expert, showing Mekhmet how to fish, something never seen in the Southern continent.

== Last Battle of the Icemark ==
Two years have passed since The Icemark defeated The Polypontian Empire in Blade of Fire. This has caused the Polypontians to break up and many civil wars have started to take their place with the defeat of the Polypontians at the end of the second book, The role of antagonist then settles on Erinor of Artemision and her Tri-horns (Triceratops used as command platforms/siege weapons, similar to war elephants), and Oskan's father Cronus, his Ice Demons and his granddaughter, Medea. Erinor's dinosaur cavalry move in on what remains of the Polypontian Empire, fully intending to move on to the Icemark afterward. Responding to a plea for help from the Empire, a reluctant Thirrin leads her army into the heart of what was once enemy territory. Initially, Thirrin hates having to work with the Polypontians, however upon meeting their emperor (who is only a young boy, not yet in his teens) she realizes that everything she hated about the Empire comes from the Bellorum clan. With them gone, feelings towards the Empire, though still embittered by previous wars, begin thawing. However, by invading the Empire to confront Erinor, the Icemark is left open to an invasion from the Darkness (Cronus and his ice demons). Fortunately, because the Vampire Queen chooses to remain behind, she and her vampires are able to defend the Icemark, launching raids and ambushes on the ice demons. Although the Vampire Queen knows she cannot win, she harries their efforts. Oskan, entrusted with the secret knowledge that Dark Adepts cannot kill the ones they love without dying, defeats Cronus and Medea at the cost of his own life.

== Prince Of The Icemark ==
Prince Of The Icemark is the prequel to The Icemark Chronicles. It was released on 6 June 2013. When his brother, the King, is killed in battle, Prince Redrought must rally his people and learn to defend his tiny kingdom against savage supernatural invaders – werewolves, vampires and zombies. Redrought must take the fight to enemy territory in The-Land-of-the-Ghosts, and it’s there he will fall or stand forever in the legends of the Icemark. Stuart Hill has stated in interviews that the book would tell the tale of how Redrought met Thirrin's mother, that Redrought will encounter the soldiers of the Holly and Oak King, and that the novel will feature a cat character called Cadwaladar.

Prince Of The Icemark was nominated for the 2015 Red House Children's Book Award.

Stuart has said he would like to write two more stories involving Redrought but he is unsure if he will get the opportunity to.

== Timeline ==
=== Introduction ===
Prior to King Redrought's reign, The Icemark had a violent history. Of the previous eight monarchs, only two died in their beds. King Redrought's reign lasted the longest. His majesty ruled for more than twenty years.

The Hypolitan of the southern continent were at war for years with eastern invaders before the Hypolitans went north into The Icemark to find peace. The eastern invaders had similar fighting methods to the Polypontians, in particular, their tendency to overwhelm their opponents by sheer force of numbers.

At the beginning of the story, The Icemark had enemies to the north (The Land-of-the-Ghosts) and to the south (Polypontus) as well as to the east and west (Sea Raiders: Zephyrs and Corsairs).

=== 400 years ago ===
There was a long, fierce war between The Icemark and Hypolitan, during which they came to respect one another. King Theobad The Bold, of The Icemark, granted land to the Hypolitan.

The Province, known as Hypolita, is ruled by woman warriors, and the monarch of The Icemark is its overlord. The Hypolitan became The Icemark's greatest ally.

Maggiore Totus, Thirrin's tutor, discovers in the Hypolitan archives that The Icemark's King Theobad had also signed a nonaggression treaty with The Land-of-the-Ghosts, which mean they had left him to fight with the Hypolitan without fear of invasion from the vampires. This indicates there's a precedent for The Icemark making a treaty with the vampires.

=== 250 Years ago ===
The Blood Wars happened 3,000 moons (250 years) prior to the events in The Cry Of The Icemark. Wolf-Folk fought against the vampire king and queen.

=== Unknown time ago ===
According to Maggiore's history lesson, the navy of the southern continent helped in the defeat of the Corsairs and Zephyrs in the great Battle of the Middle Sea. Exactly when it happened is not indicated (or not known), but it was prior to events in The Cry of The Icemark.

Ghost Wars: King Redrought defeated the army of the vampire King and Queen at the Battle of the Wolfrocks - mountain range to the north of Frostmarris and province of Hypolita.

Werewolves were banished from The Icemark after The Ghost Wars. Evil witches were banished from The Icemark, but good witches were allowed to remain, as they're good healers and midwives, can drive blight from a harvest, and are a brilliant defense against the vampire King and Queen. They're staunchly loyal and the first to offer help.

=== One Year ago ===
The Icemark was attacked by a fighting fleet of Southern Corsairs and Island Buccaneers. After massing his forces, King Redrought defeated their army at the battle of Sea Haven. The victors burned the enemy fleet. The battle lasted one day.

=== Present ===
Thirrin recognised early that there was a need for new allies; Thirrin suggested The Icemark approach The Land-of-the-Ghosts. Though enemies of The Icemark, the vampire King and Queen and their undead peoples might join them against the Polypontian Empire for their mutual benefit and safety.
