= Stuart Hill (author) =

British author (born 1958)

- Born: 11 January 1958 (age 68); Leicester, United Kingdom
- Occupation: Novelist
- Writing career
- Period: 2005—present
- Genres: Fantasy, Historical
- Website: Stuart Hill online

Stuart Hill (born 1958) is a British author. He was born in Leicester, where he still lives. He has written four books in The Icemark Chronicles: The Cry of the Icemark, Blade of Fire, Last Battle of the Icemark and Prince Of The Icemark. He studied English, Classics and Ancient History at Newcastle University.

== Biography ==
Hill left school at the age of 16 without any formal qualifications. He worked at a car factory for six years before going back to college to get his teaching degree. After teaching English in Greece for several years, he then worked as a book seller in Leicester from 1994 - 2004. Stuart then began writing the Icemark series and when his book was accepted for publication by Chicken House, he dedicated his time to writing the rest of the series. In 2005, The Cry of the Icemark, the first book in the series, was published and copyrighted.

On 25 July 2011, Hill released a new book on Kindle. Tales From Moonshiny Hall, a collection of ghost stories, was published under the name S. R. Hill.

Hill has released a couple of non-fiction books in the 'I Was There!' series called 'Richard III's Court' and 'Viking Invasion'.

Hill has written a book called Sorceress about post-Roman Britain and the struggle between the indigenous Celts and the invading Germanic tribes (Anglo-Saxons). It will be an Arthurian tale with a twist. Merlin and Arthur will not be portrayed as the good guys but as baddies. The book is currently in limbo regarding whether it will ever be released. He is also working on a self-publishing project called "Black Dog". His books have been translated into 18 languages.

== Bibliography ==
- The Cry of the Icemark (2005)
- Blade of Fire (2007)
- Last Battle of the Icemark (2008)
- Tales From Moonshiny Hall (2011)
- Prince Of The Icemark (2013)
- Richard III's Court (I Was There!) (2014)
- Viking Invasion (I Was There!) (2015)
- Shield Maiden (2016)
- The First King of England - The Story of Athelstan (2018)
- Sorceress (TBA)
