= Agatha Bârsescu =

Romanian actress

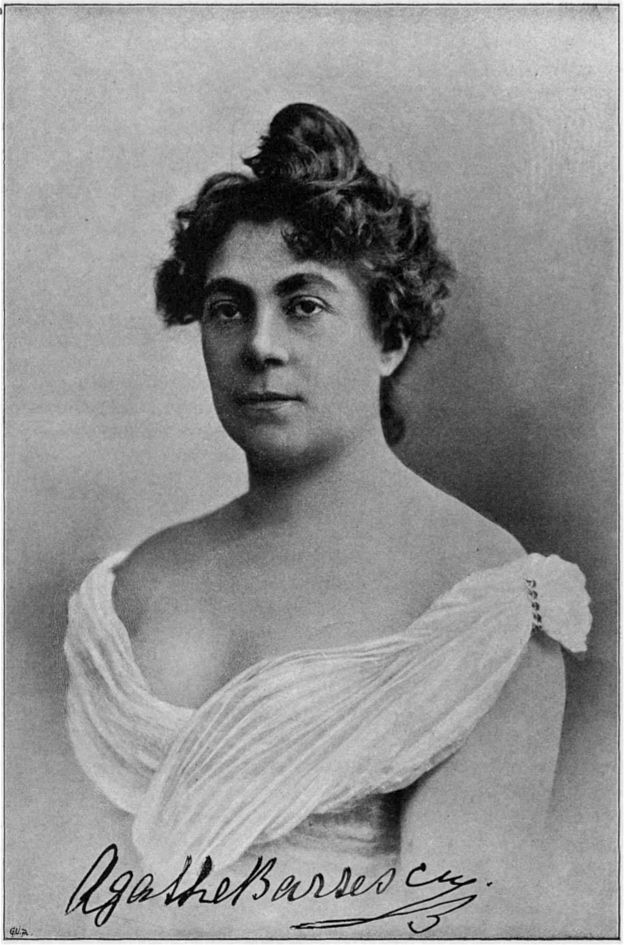
- Born: 9 September 1857; Bucharest, Principality of Wallachia
- Died: 22 November 1939 (aged 82); Iași, Romania
- Education: Bucharest Conservatory; Vienna Conservatory
- Occupations: Actress and opera singer
- Spouse: Constantin Radovici (1864-1916)

Agatha Bârsescu (1857 – 1939), also known by the name Agathe Barcesque, was a Romanian theatre actress, opera singer and teacher, known for her interpretations of Greek tragedies.

== Early life ==
Agatha Bârsescu was born on 9 September 1857 in Bucharest, which was part of the Principality of Wallachia. She was born into a military family with her father being a colonel who was on good terms with the royal family. Her uncle was the minister of war, and her brother became a general. Her sister married a colonel. She spent part of her childhood in Bârsești where her father was stationed. At the age of 8, she and her cousin were sent to a boarding school in Sibiu, 275 km north-west of Bucharest, where she learned German. Later, she went to the Ursulinenkloster, a school run by nuns in Vienna, wanting to be a nun herself. When she returned home, she enrolled in the Bucharest Conservatory. She was seen by Queen Elizabeth of Romania when she performed in a charity show. The queen persuaded her parents to send her to Paris and devote herself fully to opera. However, en route to Paris she stopped over in Vienna and chose to stay there and take canto lessons. Later she became a student at the Vienna Conservatory, where she took classes on literature, aesthetics, choreography, duel, costume and foreign languages. She won a gold medal at the end of her first year.

== Career ==
Bârsescu received a long-term contract by a theatre in Berlin but wished to return to Vienna and managed to extricate herself from the contract. In Vienna, she made her professional debut on 22 November 1883 at the Burgtheater, also known as the Imperial Court Theatre, performing as Hero in Franz Grillparzer's Hero and Leander. One newspaper, noting that the Burgtheater was in financial difficulties, wrote that "Burgtheater has found its fortune! May it last." The very favourable reception earned her other roles, such as Ophelia in Hamlet, Desdemona in Othello, and Margareta in Faust. This was followed by a lifetime contract being offered by the theatre and the title of "Court Actress" awarded by imperial decree. She had starring roles in Grillparzer's Medea and Sappho, Antigone by Sophocles, Mary Stuart by Friedrich Schiller, and as the queen in Victor Hugo's Ruy Blas after she received the title.

In addition to her professional performances, Bârsescu was well known for organizing charity performances. She became such a popular figure that she could not go out on the balcony of her home in Vienna without attracting admirers in the street. Poems were written about her, including by Heinrich Glücksmann. When she visited Romania, she was invited to the Royal Court and given several decorations. In Vienna, she was received by Emperor Franz Joseph and was surrounded by the nobility. Bârsescu decided to leave Vienna when she felt she couldn't grow artistically next to Charlotte Wolter, the first heroine of Burgtheater who could not deal with young competition. Her position was filled in by Maria Pospischil who, in three years, also gave up competing with Wolter and moved to Berlin.

In 1890 Bârsescu moved to the Stadttheater in Hamburg, receiving 12 standing ovations after her last performance in Vienna. In 1893 she undertook a long tour of Romania, performing works by Schiller and Hermann Sudermann. She then worked at the Deutsches Theater in Berlin. She followed this with performances in Paris, Budapest, and several other cities.

In 1905, Bârsescu sailed to New York City, falling sick as a result of the rough passage. After recovery, she performed in 20 shows at the Irving Place Theatre, a German-language theatre. She was offered a long-term contract, but had to return to Europe to honour prior commitments. In 1912, under the name Agathe Barcesque, she played the role of the abbess in the German silent film, The Miracle, an Austro-German co-production. The film, initially directed by Max Reinhardt and concluded under the direction of the French director, Michel-Antoine Carré, was an adaptation of the novel The Miracle by Karl Vollmöller, with music by Engelbert Humperdinck. The film was shot mainly in Vienna. After this, Bârsescu decided to return to America. She starred in several successful shows, but then World War I began and she ended up spending ten years in the US. She spent time in New York taking part in shows at the Irving Place with immigrant Romanian Jews.

In 1925 Bârsescu returned to Romania, settling in Iași, where she taught at the Conservatory of Dramatic Art for almost 15 years. She appeared sporadically on the stage of the Iași National Theatre and the National Theatre in the roles that had made her famous.

== Personal life ==
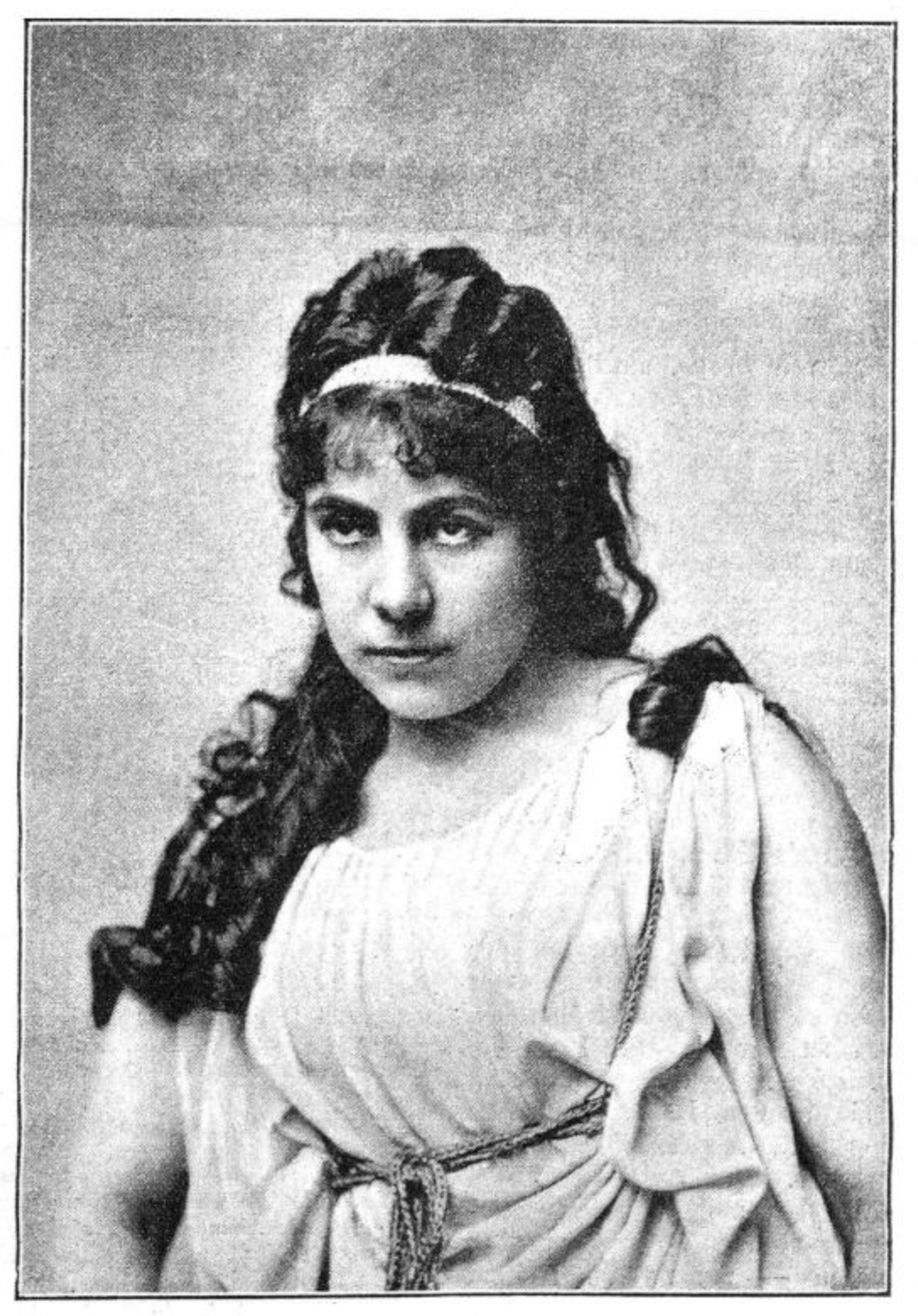
Agatha Bârsescu

Following the deaths of her mother and her sister, Zoe, Bârsescu became responsible for Zoe's two children. She had also broken her engagement with the Prince of Ghica-Comăneşti. These were perhaps the reasons why she decided to start life anew by moving to Hamburg. She stayed there for three years after which she was forced to move again to get away from the unwanted attention she had been receiving from an admirer. In 1907, Bârsescu married the actor Constantin Radovici (1864-1916). They separated in 1910 after he decided to return to Romania.

== Death ==
Bârsescu died in Iași on 22 November 1939 and was buried in the Eternitatea cemetery in Iași. The following inscription was engraved on her funeral plaque: "Here rests the brilliant tragic actress, Agata Bârsescu, glory of the Romanian nation, who performed to perfection, in the country and abroad." The street where the Iași National Theatre is located, is named after her. A postage stamp was issued in her honour in 1983.
