= Ella Mensch =

German journalist and editor (1859–1935)

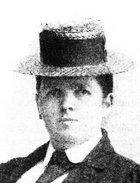
- Born: 5 March 1859; Lübben (Spreewald), Brandenburg, Kingdom of Prussia
- Died: 5 May 1935 (aged 76); Berlin, Germany
- Occupation: Journalist

Ella Mensch (5 March 1859 – 5 May 1935) was a German writer, journalist, teacher, feminist and editor. In 1886 she became one of the first German women to earn a doctorate in German Literature from the University of Zurich along with Marie Nowack. She was associated with the German Female Teacher's Association. She also served as the editor of a women's magazine, Frauen-Rundschau.

== Biography ==
Born on 5 March 1859 in Lübben (Spreewald), Brandenburg, Kingdom of Prussia, Ella Mensch was the daughter of Hermann Mensch and Fanny Stantien. In Berlin she studied at the teachers' college where she graduated with a teacher's certificate in 1879.

In 1880 she moved to Zürich and enrolled at the faculty of philosophy of the University of Zurich where she obtained a doctorate in German studies. Her PhD-supervisor at Zurich's University was Ludwig Tobler, a Swiss linguist. After her studies in Switzerland she moved back to Hessen/Germany, pursuing a long career in journalism and writing. She started her professional career as a news reporter at the Darmstädter Tageblatt, a German daily newspaper, covering opera and drama. She briefly taught at the higher educational institutions for girls in Darmstadt and Frankfurt am Main. Later on she was teaching in Berlin, where she lived from 1904 to 1935.

Since 1893 she was writing series of articles on women's issues. She was also associated with the Deutscher Frauenverein Reform, a German Women's association for reform, established by a group of women including Hedwig Kettler. Her first novel, Der Geopferte, was published in 1902.

She was 76 years old when she died in Berlin, Germany on 5 May 1935.
