= Charlotte Wolter =

Austrian actress (1834–1897)

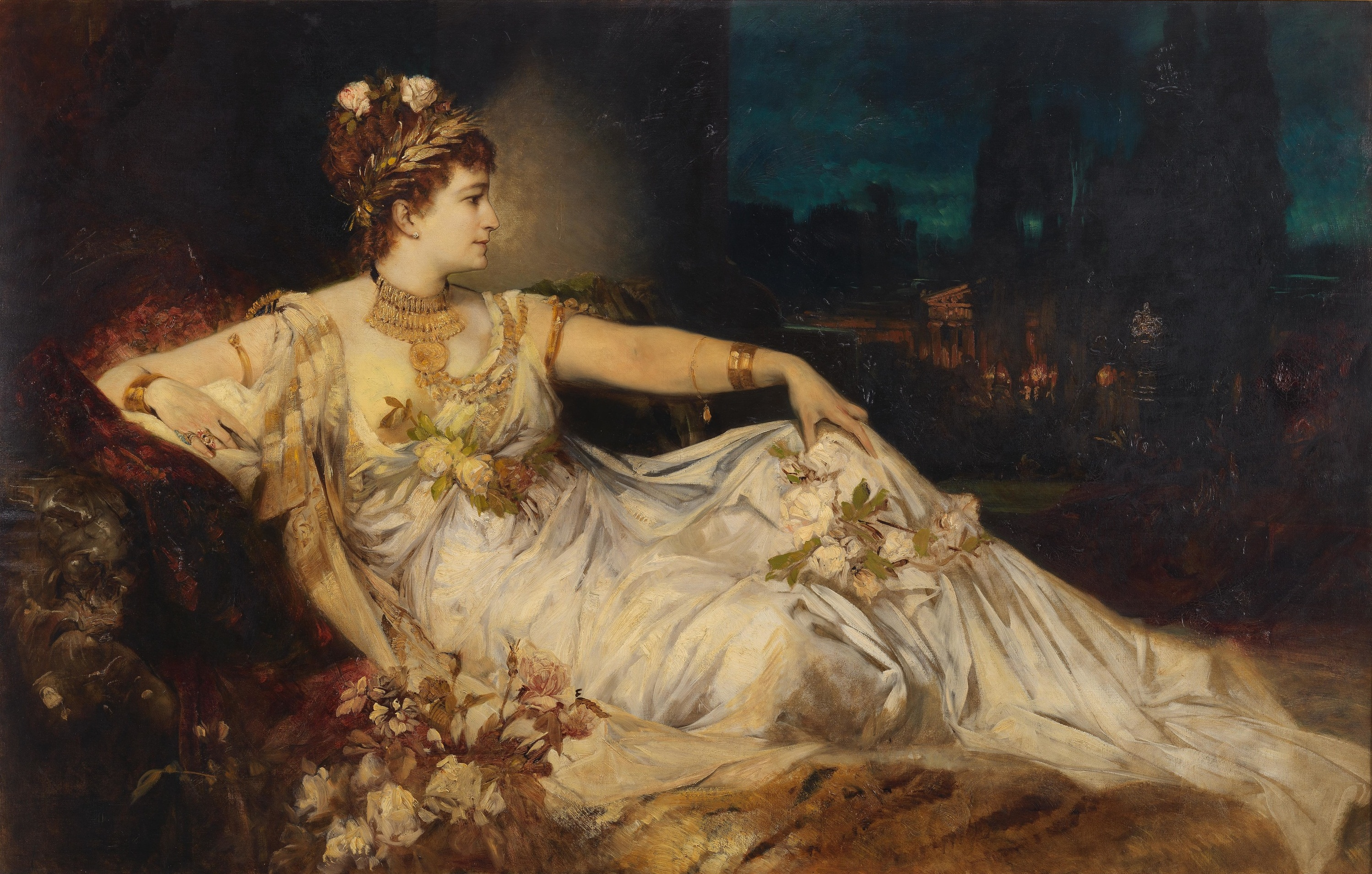
Charlotte Wolter as "Messalina" by Hans Makart in 1875

Charlotte Wolter (March 1, 1834 – June 14, 1897), Austrian actress, was born at Cologne, and began her artistic career at Budapest in 1857.

== Early career ==
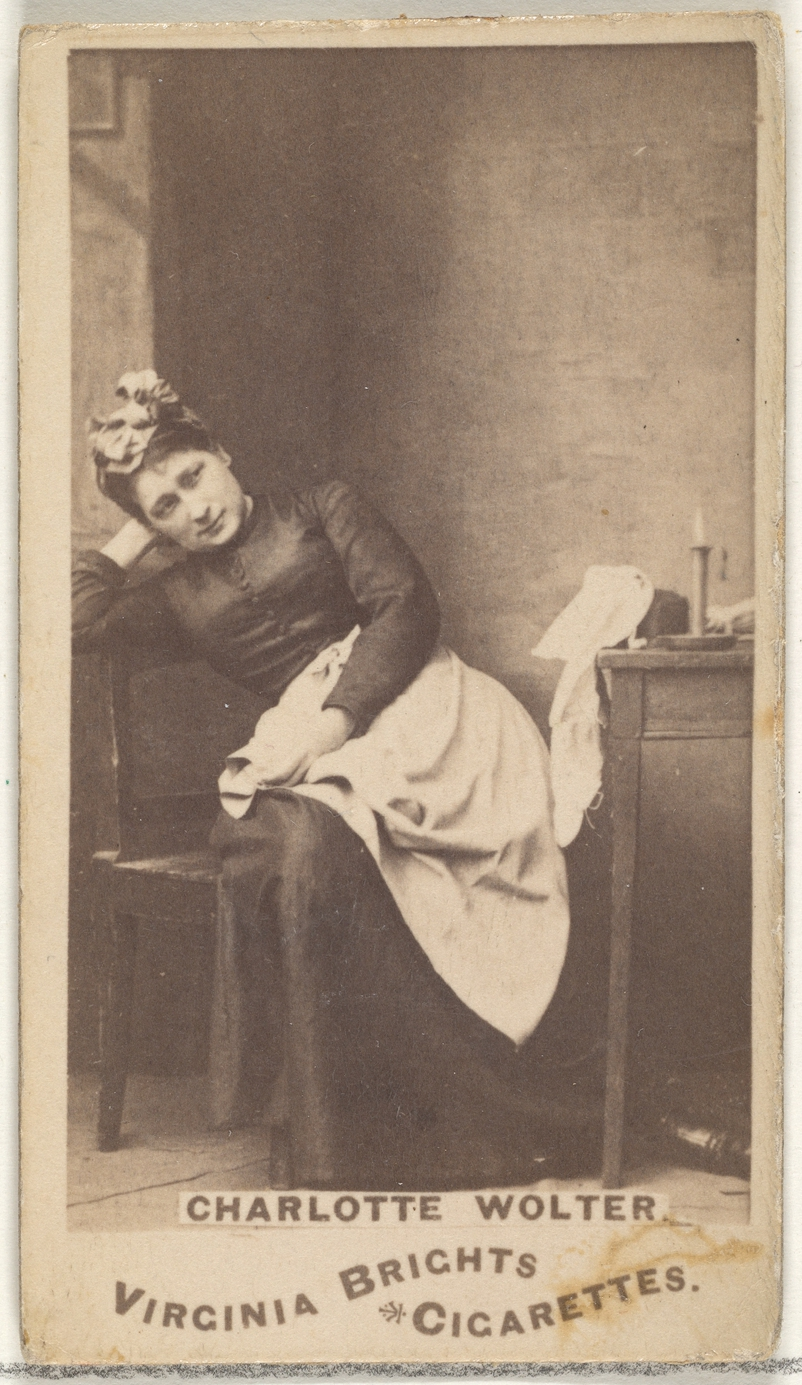
Charlotte Wolter, from the Actors and Actresses series (N45, Type 1) for Virginia Brights Cigarettes. c. 1888, Metropolitan Museum of Art

The beginning of her career was far from easy. Her first stage experience came in Cologne at the age of ten as an ice skate dancer. Her first attempt on a larger stage (Pest German Theater) in 1857, as Orphan at the Lowood (a stage version of Charlotte Brontë's Jane Eyre), failed.

For the first time, she became a box office hit in Timișoara, mainly thanks to her charming appearance. "Her "cassamagnet" status was based less on her art than on her victorious beauty, for Timișoara had a strong garrison, and when Wolter performed, the officers came to the theater." She came to Vienna, where Johann Nepomuk Nestroy hired her as an extra and for small roles at the Carl Theater.

Wolter was cast in roles with a minimum of text, or no text at all, or in the roles of maids and female feeders. Nestroy had very contemptuous views of her ability; he called her "personification of lack of talent" ("die personificirte Talentlosigkeit"). He believed that her magnificent external appearance, which drew attention to her, was her only asset. Playwright, theatre director and artistic director of Burgtheater Heinrich Laube noted about her: "The way she spoke was disgusting. The tones didn't separate clearly into words. She also had to struggle with her Rhinelander pronunciation for a long time."

It was Laube who first seriously recognized her talent. He arranged a guest performance in Brno for her, which was a success and opened her door to Victoria Theater in Berlin where she starred as queen Hermione in the Shakespeare's Winter's Tale and in Hamburg.

She applied for an engagement at Berlin Court Theater but artistic director Botho von Hülsen turned her down saying: "I can't hire you - you're too small for me!"

== Burgtheater ==
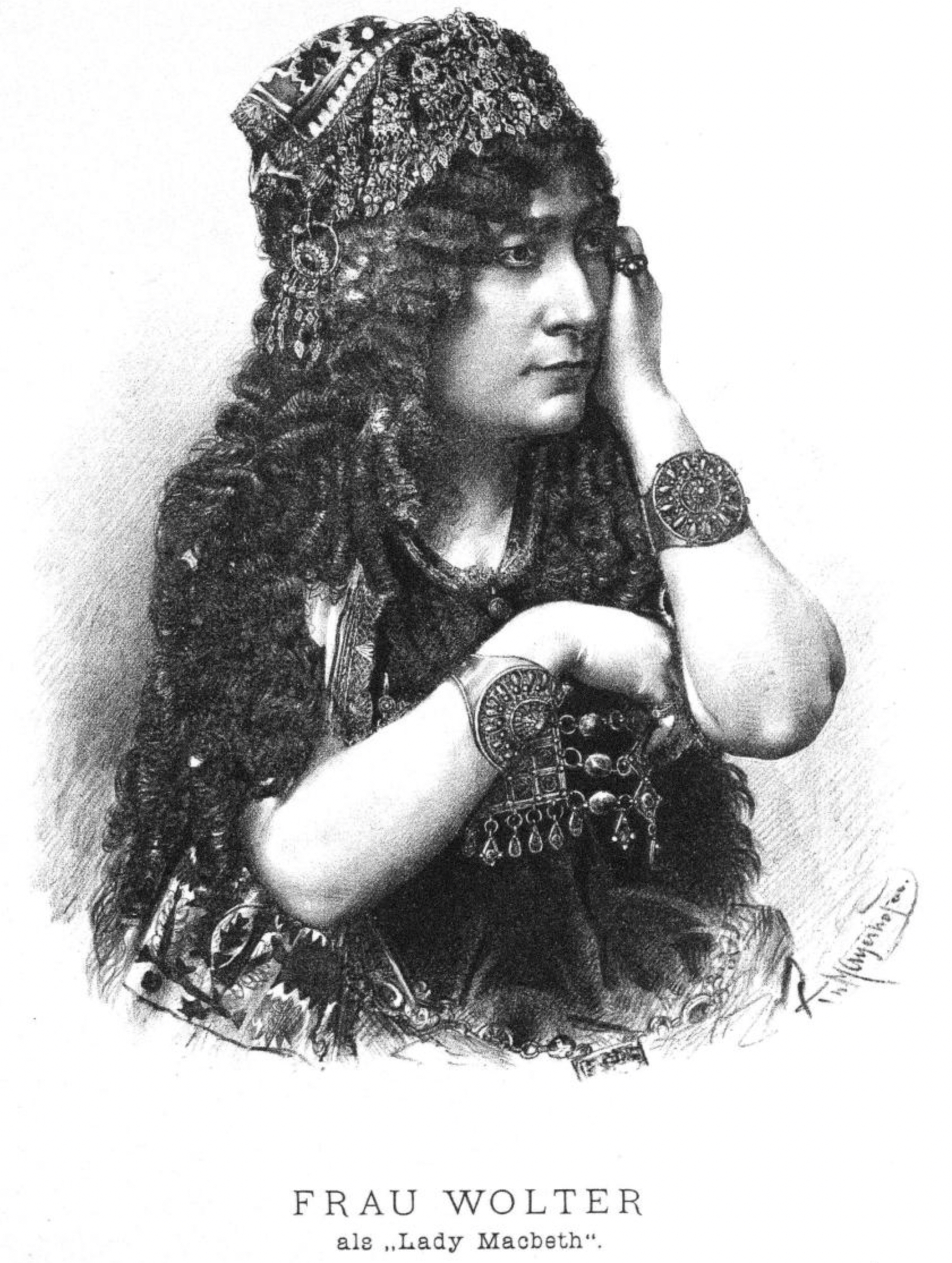
Charlotte Wolter as Lady Macbeth

In 1862 Laube invited her to give a guest performance at the Burgtheater where she performed Legouvé's and Scribe's Adrienne Lecouvreur, Jane Eyre, Schiller's Maria Stuart and Countess Ruthland in Graf von Esser. Although she had not yet completely overcome her strong provincial accent, she triumphed and was engaged.

In the following years she achieved great success as Grillparzer's Sappho and Medea, Mosenthal's Deborah or Racine's Phèdre. Wolter's repertoire was so astonishingly large. She played almost 127 first or main roles at the Burgtheater during her career (in total of 2103 performances). German dramatist Adolf Wilbrandt dedicated her the role of empress Messalina in his tragedy Arria und Messalina, a role that became very popular with many actresses at that time.

In 1874 she married a Belgian diplomat, Count Charles O'Sullivan de Grass (* 1836, † 1888), who was also designing some of her costumes.

Wolter eventually became a cultural icon of Vienna. Her fans went to the Burgtheater to hear the famous dark mezzo-soprano "Wolterschrei" (Wolter's scream), an outburst or scream of passion in climax scenes, and public rewarded it afterwards with a big round of applause. She was using this voice mannerism of hers, her true trademark in most of her tragic creations, notably Lady Macbeth, Phèdre, Sappho, and Maria Stuart. Many critics were divided in their judgment though and accused Wolter of "overburdening" such parts.

Having overcome an initial setback in her career, she refused to yield tragic heroine roles to younger actresses, whom she rightly saw as artistic competition. Her tactics to preserve her position were frequently viewed as unladylike and overstepping acceptable bounds. As a result, talented younger actresses at the height of their appeal—including Katharina Frank, Agatha Bârsescu, Maria Pospischil, and Rosa Poppe—were unable to develop their potential and ultimately left Vienna.

Wolter, although often sick and unable to perform, made herself clear that she would not give up any role to her competition when she reached the age of one hundred. Her reluctance to share the stage with her younger colleagues raised questions about the future of the theater. "The management of the Imperial and Royal Hofburg Theater, as well as the great actress Charlotte Wolter, who, however, thinks and acts very pettily in "certain" things, is doing everything in their power to spoil the position of this talented and important artist at the Burgtheater. Mrs. Wolter likes to try to "play" Miss Pospischil out of the theater in a similar way she once successfully managed to get rid of Miss Katharina Frank. However, we believe that this time, despite the strong support of the director Dr. Burckhard, she will not succeed, and we are certain that Miss Pospischil is sensible enough to calmly defy all hostility and intrigue, for at that time Mrs. Wolter was 18 years younger, whereas today, even if she herself does not believe it, she has already become a matron." She played young characters until old age, which was especially criticized and even ridiculed at the end of her career.

She recognized the talent of Adele Sandrock, supported her and for her first big role of Isabella in Der Fall Clémenceau (Affäre Clémenceau) by Alexandre Dumas Fils and Armand d'Artois, she even loaned her fur coat for the costume. She noted of her: "Finally, a real talent."

According to her wish, she was buried in the costume of Iphigenia designed by her husband, a costume in which role she had achieved her most brilliant success.

== Legacy ==
Charlotte Wolter was one of the great tragic actresses of her age. Her repertory included Medea, Sappho, Lady Macbeth, Mary Stuart, Preciosa, Phèdre, Adrienne Lecouvreur, Jane Eyre and Messalina, in which character she was immortalized by the painter Hans Makart. She was also an inimitable exponent of the heroines in plays by Grillparzer, Hebbel, Dumas and Sardou.

In his memoir The World of Yesterday Stefan Zweig wrote about the death of Wolter: "I remember, for instance, a day in my earliest youth when our cook burst into the sitting room with tears in her eyes: she had just heard that Charlotte Wolter, the star actress of the Burgtheater, had died. The grotesque aspect of her extravagant grief, of course, lay in the fact that our old, semi-literate cook had never once been to that distinguished theatre herself, and had never seen Charlotte Wolter either on stage or in real life, but in Vienna a great Austrian actress was so much part of the common property of the entire city that even those entirely unconnected with her felt her death was a catastrophe."
