= Lavinia Schulz =

German dancer and actress

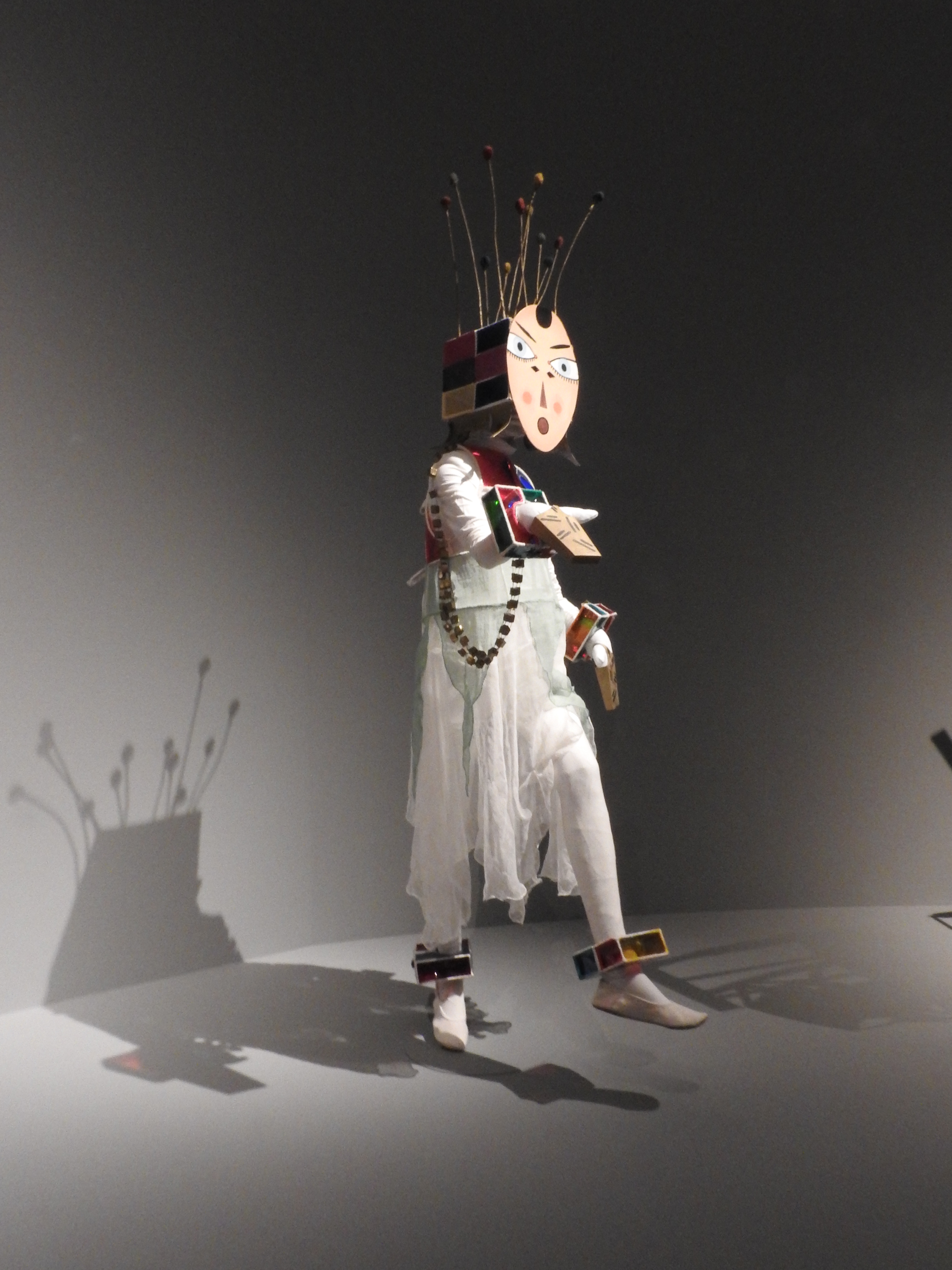
- Born: 23 June 1896; Lübben (Spreewald), German Empire
- Died: 19 June 1924 (aged 27); Hamburg, Germany

Lavinia Berta Schulz (23 June 1896 – 19 June 1924) was a German dancer and actress.

== Life ==
Schulz was born in Lübben in 1896. She trained in Berlin after recovering from a major ear operation. She studied dance, music and painting and by 1913 she was involved with the group of Expressionists which included Herwarth Walden's Sturm. She was proclaimed Lothar Schreyer's "first student" and she moved with him to Hamburg where she was not only the costume creator but also a dancer. She danced in a robotic inspired costume in his production of Skirnismól.

In April 1920, she married Walter Holdt, who also became her artistic partner. They rejected conventional religion and expressionism as a complete solution and they would have liked to have lived without money. They lived without a bed or furniture and they lived in dance tights so that could devote their days to creating new dances and accompanying costumes.

Schulz's costumes were photographed by Minya Diez-Dührkoop. Facing financial ruin, she died in Hamburg in 1924, having shot her partner and then herself. Thirty costumes and photographs of her work were stored in a Hamburg museum.

== Legacy ==
Schulz's costumes were rediscovered in a Hamburg museum in 1989. Berit Glanz' German novel Pixeltänzer is woven around the life and work of Lavinia and her husband and the question of how it relates to the present times.
