= Carl Siegemund Schönebeck =

German composer and cellist

Carl Siegemund Schönebeck (26 October 1758 in Lübben, Germany – early 1800s) was a German composer and cellist. Few of his works have survived. The compositions attributed to him show features of originality and have been compared to Ludwig van Beethoven's.

== Biography ==
Schönebeck, in line with his parents' wishes, aspired to become a surgeon, but felt so drawn to music that at age 14 he decided to have lessons from a musician in his home town of Lübben. He had some years of study in Lübben, and later in the Silesian city of Grünberg, but was largely self-taught as a violinist and as a player of several wind instruments. However, when a cello virtuoso arrived in Grünberg, he was so fascinated by the instrument that he taught himself to play it.

Two years later he was invited to join the Duke of Dohna's orchestra in the Saxon province of Kotzenau. Then in 1780, Schönebeck became a town musician in Sorau, Lower Lusatia (now Żary, Poland). In order to continue perfecting his music, Schönebeck travelled to Potsdam, where he met the cello virtuoso Jean-Louis Duport. He also travelled to Dresden to play alongside the French cellist Jean Balthasar Tricklir.

In 1787, Schönebeck joined the Duke of Courland's orchestra in the Silesian province of Sagan. Four years later he moved to the Duke Truchsess zu Waldburg's orchestra, near the Prussian city of Königsberg (now known as Kaliningrad, Russia). He stayed there for two years, until he was transferred to the heart of Königsberg where he worked as a cellist in the orchestra and as a church organist. Some four years later Schönebeck and his wife tried without success to set themselves up as farmers near Lübben.

It was in his native city of Lübben where he finally established himself as a composer and music teacher. By 1800 he was able to present his own compositions in Leipzig.

It is not clear exactly when he died. In Volume IV of Ernst Ludwig Gerber's encyclopedia Neues Lexikon der Tonkünstler, he is described as a virtuoso cellist and apparently still alive in 1814; however other sources say that he died in 1806.

== Works ==
Schönebeck composed light operas, quartets, duets for two cellos and for cello and viola, as well as concertos for cello, flute, horn and clarinet. Most of his works are lost.

== Sources ==
- Gerber, Ernst Ludwig, Neues historisch-biographisches Lexikon der Tonkünstler, Volume 4 (S–Z), Leipzig, 1814, column 110–112

== Links ==
- Online biography in German: Schönebeck (Carl Siegmund), Neues historisch-biographisches Lexikon der Tonkünstler, 1814.
- Schönebeck, Carl Siegemund, Catalog of works, Deutsche National Bibliothek.
- Free scores by Carl Siegemund Schönebeck at the International Music Score Library Project (IMSLP)
