= Minya Diez-Dührkoop =

German photographer

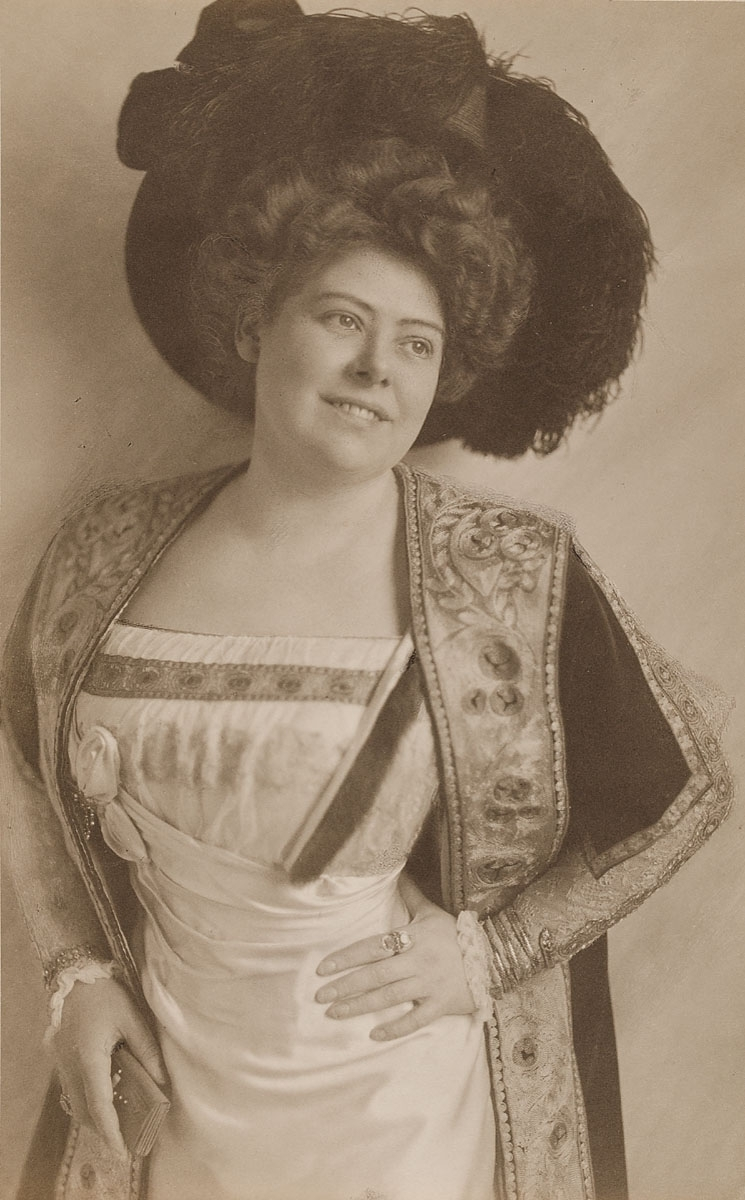
- Born: 21 June 1873; Hamburg, German Empire
- Died: 17 November 1929 (aged 56); Hamburg, Weimar Republic
- Occupation: Photographer

Minya Diez-Dührkoop or Dièz-Dührkoop (21 June 1873 – 17 November 1929) was a German photographer.

== Biography ==
Diez-Dührkoop was born in Hamburg in 1873. Her mother was Maria Louise Caroline, née Matzen, and her father was Rudolf Dührkoop, who would later become a noted photographer. He started his portrait business in 1883 and his fourteen-year-old daughter became his assistant in 1887. She worked with growing independence and married in 1894, to another photographer; Luis Diéz Vazquez, from Málaga. By 1900 she and father were operating different branches of their Berlin business. The following year she divorced her husband but retained his name Diez in her name.

They had a successful business, and they took portraits of many notable subjects. They mixed in artistic circles, and they owned a modernist painting by Alma del Banco. Other contacts included Lavinia Schulz and her husband. Schulz's costumes were photographed by Diez-Dührkoop. Schulz died in Hamburg in 1924. She shot her partner and then herself. Thirty costumes and Diez-Dührkoop's photographs of her work were stored in a Hamburg museum.

Diez-Dührkoop died in 1929 in Hamburg.
