= King Ottocar: His Rise and Fall =

1823 tragedy by Franz Grillparzer

King Ottocar: His Rise and Fall (German: König Ottokars Glück und Ende, lit. 'King Ottokar's Fortune and End') is a tragedy in five acts written by Franz Grillparzer in 1823. Based on the historical events surrounding the life of Ottokar II of Bohemia, the play deals with the fall of the king from the height of his powers to his death, having lost most of his supporters and lands, largely through his own actions.

Grillparzer had originally wanted to write a tragedy about Napoleon, however, fearing censorship from Austrian authorities, instead used King Ottokar II of Bohemia (1253–1278) as the central figure, as there were a number of parallels in personality traits and circumstances.

The play was completed in 1823, but publication was delayed by censorship issues, notably the "unfortunate allusion to Napoleon's second marriage to Marie-Louise of Austria, and its unfavourable portrayal of Bohemia". The wife of Francis II, Holy Roman Emperor, Caroline Augusta of Bavaria read the play and urged her husband to allow it to be publicly performed, which took place for the first time on February 19, 1825 in Vienna's Burgtheater.

The play's nationalistic themes in particular were criticised when first released, and remain controversial today. However the tight focus on the personal tragedy of Ottokar, at once the cause and the victim of events around him, as well as the elegance of the verse, has maintained the popularity of the play among students and audiences to the present.

== Characters ==
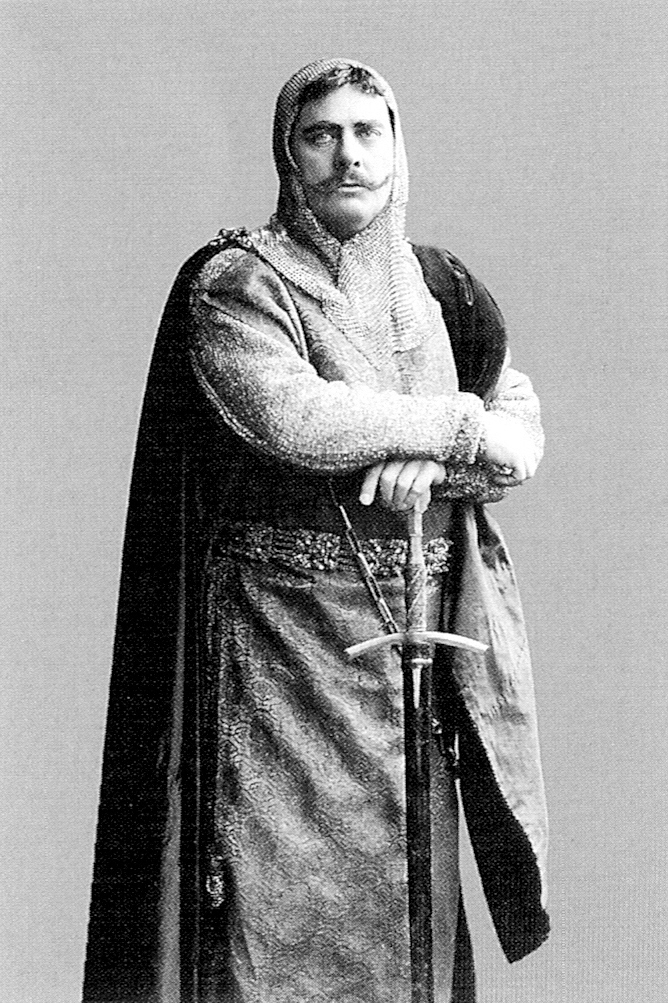
Max Devrient as Zawisch in the Burgtheater in Vienna 1891.

- Primislaus Ottokar, King of Bohemia
- Margarethe von Österreich, widow of Heinrich von Hohenstaufen, his wife
- Benesch von Diedicz, Milota und Zawisch, the Rosenbergs
- Berta, daughter of Benesch
- Braun von Olmütz, Chancellor to the King
- Bela, King of Hungary
- Kunigunde von Massovien, his granddaughter
- Rudolf von Habsburg
- Albrecht und Rudolf, his sons
- Friedrich Zollern, Burggraf of Nuremberg
- Heinrich von Lichtenstein and Berthold Schenk von Emerberg, Austrian knights
- Old Merenberg, Friedrich Pettauer and Seyfried Merenberg, Styrian knights
- Herbott von Füllenstein
- Ortolf von Windischgrätz
- Ottokar von Hornek
- Merenberg's wife
- Paltram Vatzo, Mayor of Vienna
- Mayor of Prague
- A royal herald
- Der Küster von Götzendorf
- Chancellor of the Archbishop of Mainz
- Elisabeth, Margarete's chambermaid
- Kunigunde's chambermaid
- Members of the German electoral committee
- Bohemian, Austrian, Styrian, Carinthian nobility and warriors

== Synopsis of plot ==
The tragedy begins in the year 1261. Ottokar is at the height of his powers, having recently defeated the Hungarians at the Battle of Kressenbrunn, and the play opens with news that Ottokar is divorcing from his wife Margarete, on the grounds that she cannot bear an heir, and that they are in any case distantly related. Instead, he is to marry Kunigunde, young relative of the Hungarian King Bela, news which breaks the heart of Berta, one of Margarete's most beautiful ladies-in-waiting who Ottokar had previously seduced, as well as alienating her family, the Rosenbergs. Despite revealing that she never loved Ottokar, and only married him after the death of her first husband out of a sense of duty, Margarete is nevertheless deeply upset by this rejection and betrayal, although still waives her rights to retain the lands of Austria and Styria inherited from her first marriage.

Ottokar then marries Kunigunde, who becomes his new queen, despite the age difference. Meanwhile, Zawisch Rosenberg is struck by her beauty, and sets out to seduce her behind Ottokar's back. Kunigunde, unimpressed by Ottokar's age and personality, is attracted by Zawisch and encourages his advances. Unaware of this, Ottokar is provisionally offered the crown of Holy Roman Emperor, however haughtily replies that he will take time to consider the offer. In this intervening period, a letter is rushed to an influential figure among the electors, the Archbishop of Mainz, outlining Ottokar's treatment of Margarete, and the crown is instead offered to the more worthy but lowly Duke Rudolf von Habsburg. In addition, it is announced that the states of Austria and Styria are deemed to have not been passed onto Ottokar following his divorce from Margarete.

Ottokar is enraged by both these decisions, and both sides draw up forces on the banks of the Danube. Ottokar's chancellor persuades him to meet with the Emperor on an island on the Danube to discuss reconciliation. During these discussions, Ottokar indicates he is prepared pay homage to the imperial crown in the interests of peace, but is not prepared to concede his lands. However it is made clear to him that he his behaviour towards Merenberg and Margerete has alienated both Austrian and Styrian subjects, who now transfer their support to Rudolf. As a result, Ottokar is forced to withdraw his claims and be content with retaining the regions of Moravia and Bohemia. The ceremony for this requires him to kneel before Rudolf, and in the interests of decorum this is performed in a tented area. However, the mischievous Zawisch cuts the ropes of the tent, revealing Ottokar on his knees before his enemy, to all in attendance, including his own army.

Ottokar then goes into hiding for two weeks, before returning to Prague weakened and in shame. On his return, representatives of the Emperor arrive demanding the release of a number of prisoners, one of the conditions of the peace treaty. At first Ottokar acquiesces, however on seeing Merenberg among the prisoners, his anger is piqued, and instead he tears up the treaty and demands that Merenberg be executed as a traitor, for his role in communicating the letter to the Archbishop of Mainz, and act which Ottokar considers to have been the starting point of all the subsequent betrayals. Merenberg is then executed by Ottokar's men, by flinging him from a tower.

Ottokar is then spurned by Kunigunde, who openly tells him she has no respect for a man who kneels before his enemies. This further humiliation, spurs Ottokar to raise an army against all who defy him, attempting to restore his lost lands, power, and dignity. Kunigunde then flees with Zawisch, to seek protection from the Emperor Rudolf.

On the eve of the battle with Rudolf's armies, Ottokar stumbles upon the deathbed of his former wife Margarete. Seeing her dead, having suffered at his hands, he regrets his treatment of her. As the battle draws up, Ottokar's remaining loyal lords urge him to act decisively to make the best of his strategic strengths, however he is by now hesitant and incapable of decisive action, as he begins to become aware of his tragic failings. Meanwhile, Emperor Rudolf, recognising with pity how so many of Ottokar's supporters have deserted him (including Kunigunde and Zawisch), orders that no one should kill Ottokar in battle other than in self-defence. However, when Seyfried von Merenberg encounters Ottokar on the battlefield, he seeks revenge for the death of his father, and forces Ottokar, lame through injury, into a fight, in which Ottokar is killed. On the battlefield, Rudolf, founder of the Habsburg dynasty, bequeaths the states of Styria and Austria to his children, and is hailed as a noble and gracious victor by all.

== Characterisation ==
The play is very much focused on the central character Ottokar, his personality, and how he becomes the victim of his own actions. At the start of the play, he is at the height of his powers. He has proven himself on the battlefield, and has been hailed by all as a hero. However he is incapable of moderating his emotions or actions, and feels beyond reproach in all that he does, and loses the ability to distinguish right from wrong, loyalty from treachery, and what is reasonable from what is unreasonable.

We do not see Ottokar during his rise to power, however the implications are that the same essential traits that propelled him forward are, when unmoderated, those that bring him down: his sense of greatness and historical importance in the world mark him out as a mighty leader, yet also lead him to see others as merely pawns in his personal game; his pride is clearly a strong motivating factor for him, but also clouds his judgement; he is a determined warrior, yet does not know when to fight and when to resort to diplomacy.

Inevitably, the other characters in the play are less fully examined, and are defined more by the reaction that they bring about in Ottokar than having real depth in themselves. Margerete, Berta, and Seyfried Merenberg are in their own ways loyal to Ottokar, however they are all turned against him when he does not return their loyalty. Zawisch and Kunigunde are duplicitous, and yet Ottokar places much faith in them, and is most hurt when they betray him as his star falls. Rudolf is everything a good leader should be, yet Ottokar is not: strong yet just, noble yet humble, peace-loving yet not afraid to fight when he needs to. Perhaps inevitably, given the context of when the play was written, his status is too simply that of a paragon of leadership, a thinly veiled attempt to praise the Habsburg dynasty still ruling in Austria at the time.

== Action and consequences ==
The plot of the play follows the decline in the fortunes of Ottokar, and points to the causal relationship between his behaviour towards others, and the consequences for himself: Ottokar's treatment of Margarete costs him the crown of Holy Roman Emperor; by spurning Berta, he alienates the Rosenbergs, who are then able to undermine him (particularly Zawisch) in numerous ways, none more so than by ensuring the letter to the Archbishop of Mainz reaches its destination; by executing Merenberg, he drives Seyfried to kill him in revenge; and by failing to respond rationally to the peace treaties of Rudolf, he instigates a war with disastrous consequences for him and his people. Grillparzer was keen to emphasise that in historical tragedy, man is not merely the victim of circumstances or fate, but has the power to carve out his own destiny.

Grillparzer contrasts Ottokar actions with those of Rudolf, which show that by being a good and just leader, it is possible to create unity among rival factions, to inspire true loyalty, and to be victorious.

However, for lesser characters, this causal relationship is less clear, for instance in the case of 'good' characters such as Margerete and 'innocent' ones such as Berta, both of whom are victims of Ottokar's egotism and self-interest, along with Merenberg and his son, who are turned away from Ottokar simply for standing up against his wrongdoings. Meanwhile, Zawisch and Kunigunde appear to benefit from following their own desires despite behaving in a thoroughly immoral fashion.

== Sources ==
The principal source used by Grillparzer was the Middle High German piece Steirische Reimchronik ("Rhymed Chronicle of Styria") written in 1306–20 by Ottokar of Styria (Otacher ouz der Geul). It is likely that he also used various periodicals in order to build up a fuller understanding of the historical context.

== Historical accuracy ==
Grillparzer felt that a true historical context was important to a tragedy's ability to create 'a certain consistency and appearance of reality, which in turn would evoke in the audience a greater sympathy with the tragic hero. However he also recognised that it was also necessary to depart from the facts in order to highlight the dramatic themes.

Although we are not given an explicit timeline in the play, the insinuation is that the events unfold over a relatively short period (perhaps a few months, or even years). Historically, a full 22 years separates the aftermath of the Battle of Kressenbrunn in 1260 with Ottokar's death in 1278 and Rudolf von Habsburg bequeathing the lands of Austria and Styria to his sons in 1282.

Grillparzer also embellishes historical sources in other ways, particularly in imbuing motives: in the play, Ottokar's desire for an heir, merely cloaks his lust for Kunigunde. He had previously enticed away Berta, a young noblewoman, from Seyfried von Merenberg, whom he makes the son of Siegfried, who figures in the "Chronicle." His desertion of Berta had arrayed against him the hostility of the three Rosenbergs, powerful and unscrupulous Bohemian nobles – Benesch, the father, Milota, the uncle, and Zawisch, the cousin, of Bertha. Zawisch, impelled mainly by desire to wreak vengeance upon the king, seeks to gain the affection of the queen. Ottokar's treatment of Margaret alienates from him the nobles of Austria and Styria. The indignities heaped upon them open the eyes of the delegates who have come to offer him the imperial crown. His overweening pride in ostensibly disdaining the title of emperor prepares the way for his final downfall.

== Historical context ==
The context of the writing of the drama was very much shaped by Grillparzer's relationship with the Austrian state in which he lived. Inspired by the initial desire to write a tragedy about Napoleon, Grillparzer realised that the heavy-handed state censors of the Metternich regime would never allow him to use such a sensitive subject. By choosing a figure from the 13th century, whose rise and fall in many ways echoed that of Napoleon, Grillparzer hoped he would avoid censorial intervention. In addition, partly out of a sense of genuine patriotism, but also partly to make the play yet more favourable to Austrian authorities, Grillparzer includes various pro-Habsburg elements in his drama. These include: the character of Rudolf I of Germany himself, founder of the Habsburg dynasty still ruling in the 19th century; the message that, under a just ruler, the disparate states of Austria-Hungary could successfully be part of a united empire (at a time when this empire was starting to creak at the joints); and not least in the monologue of Otto von Hornek in Act III, since known as the 'Praise of Austria' ('die Lobrede auf Österreich'), which has been taught in isolation to many generations of Austrian schoolchildren since.

In the context of subsequent historical events, notably the dissolution of the Austro-Hungarian empire at the end of World War I, and the rise of German nationalism leading to World War II, such overt patriotism seems not only anachronistic and out of place but also potentially unpalatable to modern tastes.

At the time, these themes failed to achieve Grillparzer's aims of become the nation's favourite playwright. Not only did the censors suppress publication of the play for 2 years on the grounds of its 'unfavourable allusion to Napoleon's second marriage to Maria-Louise of Austria and unfavourable portrayal of Bohemia', but critical reception was mixed after its eventual public performance (a result of the direct intervention of Caroline Auguste of Bavaria). Pro-Habsburg critics pointed out that Rudolf had only a minor role compared to Ottokar, while in turn the Czechs disapproved that the play depicts their national hero in a negative light

== See also ==
- House of Rosenberg
