= Hans Walter Gruhle =

German psychiatrist (1880–1958)

Hans Walter Gruhle (7 November 1880, in Lübben – 3 October 1958) was a German psychiatrist known for his work on the relationship between criminology and psychology.

Gruhle was educated in Leipzig, Würzburg, and Munich, receiving his first doctorate in Munich in 1904 under the supervision of Emil Kraepelin. In 1905, he joined the psychology department at Heidelberg University, remaining there for almost 30 years. Soon after he began working at Heidelberg, he met Max Weber and his wife, Marianne Weber. He subsequently advised Weber's work in the field of experimental psychology. He received his second doctorate, a habilitation, from Heidelberg.

His most notable work was "Comprehending Psychology" (1948), which discusses the relationship between psychology and other sciences. He also wrote journal articles about such topics as the sterilization of criminals and the utility of the ergograph.
