= Lübben (Spreewald) =

Lübben (Spreewald) Lubin (Błota)
- Town
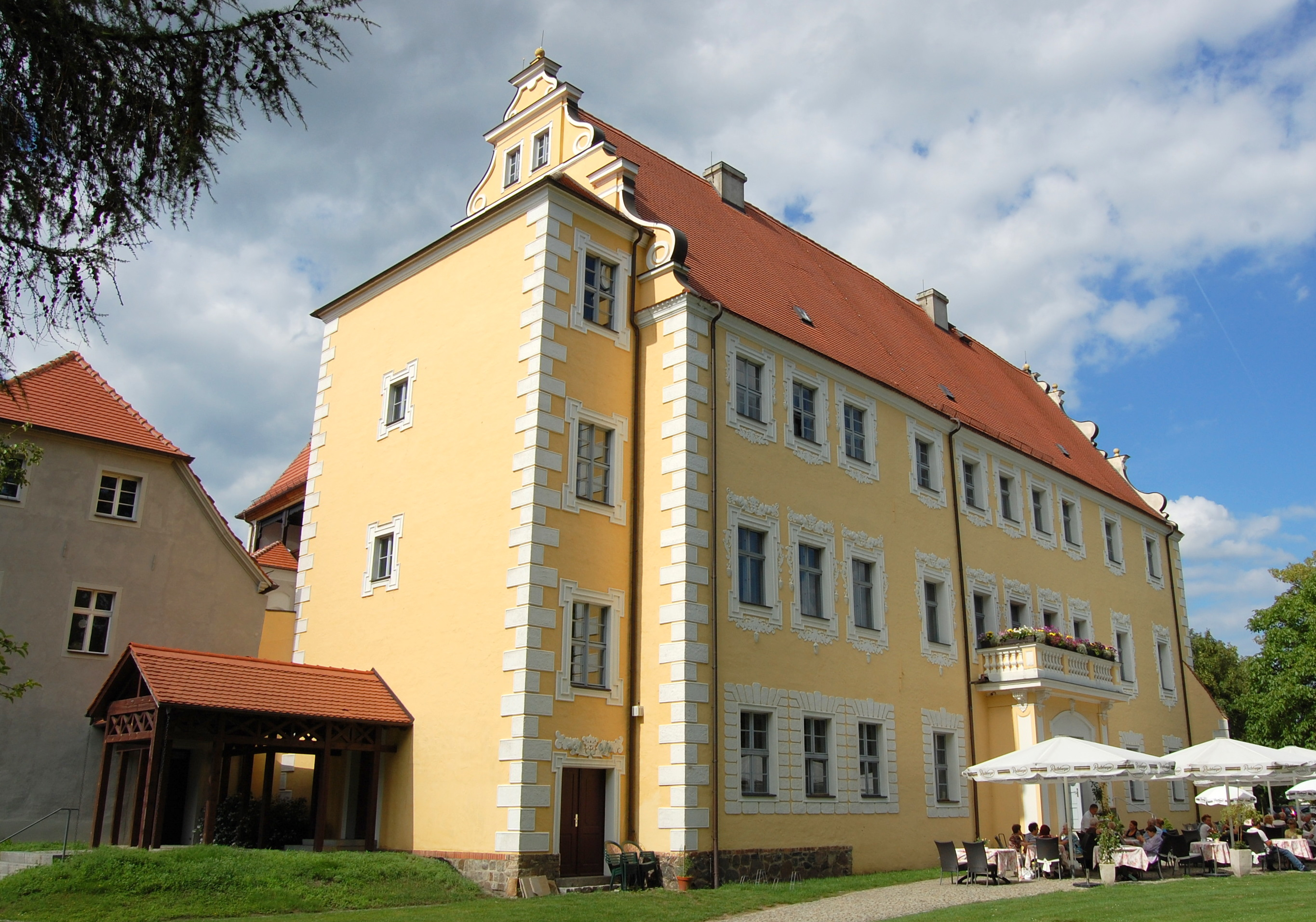
- Lübben Castle

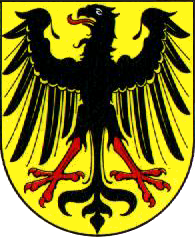
- Coat of arms

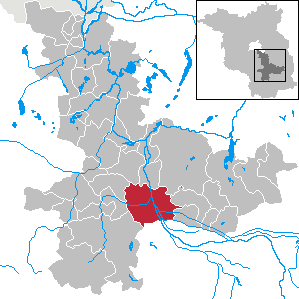
- Location of Lübben (Spreewald); Lubin (Błota) within Dahme-Spreewald district
- Interactive map of Lübben (Spreewald); Lubin (Błota)
- Location within Germany Location within Brandenburg
- Coordinates: 51°57′N 13°54′E
- Country: Germany
- State: Brandenburg
- District: Dahme-Spreewald
- Subdivisions: 6 Ortsteile bzw. Stadtbezirke

Government
  - Mayor (2022–30): Jens Richter (CDU)

Area
  - Total: 120.85 km^{2} (46.66 sq mi)
- Elevation: 50 m (160 ft)

Population (2025-12-31)
  - Total: 13,992
  - Density: 115.78/km^{2} (299.87/sq mi)
- Time zone: UTC+01:00 (CET)
  - Summer (DST): UTC+02:00 (CEST)
- Postal codes: 15907
- Dialling codes: 03546
- Vehicle registration: LDS
- Website: www.luebben.de

Lübben (Spreewald) (German pronunciation: [ˈlʏbn̩]) or Lubin (Błota) (in Lower Sorbian) is a town of 14,000 people, capital of the Dahme-Spreewald district; it is in the historical Lower Lusatia region and is in the state of Brandenburg, in eastern Germany.

Lübben is situated in the Spree Forest biosphere reserve region, between the Upper and Lower Spree Forest.

The municipality is part of the Sorbian settlement area; the German and Lower Sorbian languages have equal status.

== Names ==
The town is often known simply as Lübben or Lubin in the local languages. The suffix "Spreewald"/"Błota" denotes the Spree Forest. No other town is called Lübben, (Note: Łubno in Pomerania has the German name Lubben) but several places in Poland are named Lubin. The name can also be rendered in German as Lübben im Spreewald (Lübben in the Spreewald).

The linguist and scholar Arnošt Muka wrote in 1927 that Lubin meant "settlement of the glory-loving" or "peace-loving". Other suggested meanings include "deep place on the Spree" and "belonging to Lubomir". Lübben derives from Lubin. The Spreewald is named after the Spree river, while Błota means "the swamps".

The German name Lübben is similar to that of the neighbouring town, Lübbenau.

== Administrative structure ==
The districts of the town are (names given in German and Lower Sorbian):

- Lübben Stadt/Lubin město
- Hartmannsdorf/Hartmanojce
- Lubolz/Lubolc
  - Groß Lubolz/Wjelike Lubolce
  - Klein Lubolz/Małe Lubolce
- Neuendorf/Nowa Wjas
- Radensdorf/Radom
- Steinkirchen/Kamjena
- Treppendorf/Ranchow

== History ==
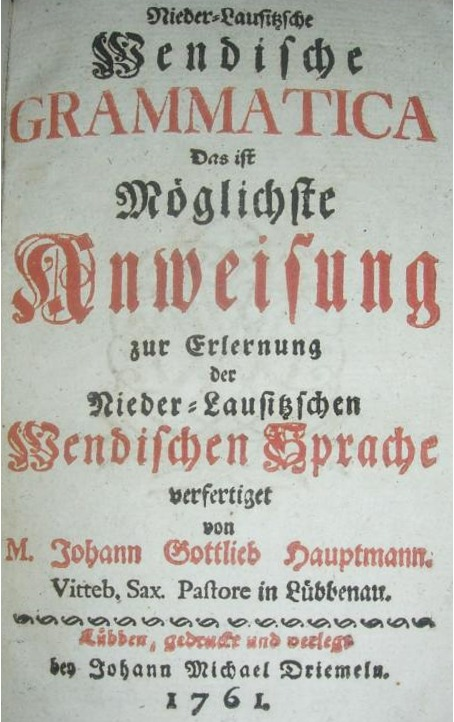
Title page of a German book about the Lower Sorbian language, published in 1761 in Lübben.

The castle of Lubin in the March of Lusatia was first mentioned in an 1150 register of Nienburg Abbey and had received town privileges according to Magdeburg law by 1220. It was located on a trade route from Luckau to Gubin and Poznań. From 1301 the town in the centre of the Spreewald floodplain was in the possession of the monks of Dobrilugk Abbey, who sold it to Duke Rudolph I of Saxe-Wittenberg in 1329. After several conflicts with the Wittelsbach margraves of Brandenburg the March of Lusatia was finally acquired by Emperor Charles IV of Luxembourg in 1367 who incorporated Lübben into the Kingdom of Bohemia. In the 15th century Lübben became the seat of the Bohemian Vogt administrator and the provincial diet (Landtag) of Lower Lusatia.

In 1526 the House of Habsburg inherited the Bohemian kingdom including Lusatia, which in 1623 Ferdinand II of Habsburg had to give in pawn to Elector John George I of Saxony. The Saxon Electorate finally acquired Lübben by signing the 1635 Peace of Prague. After the Napoleonic Wars it fell to the Prussian province of Brandenburg by the final act of the 1815 Congress of Vienna. One of the main escape routes for insurgents of the unsuccessful Polish November Uprising from partitioned Poland to the Great Emigration led through the town.

During World War II, the Oflag III-C and Oflag 8 prisoner-of-war camps for Polish, French, British, Australian, New Zealander, Belgian and Dutch officers, a forced labour subcamp of the Nazi prison in Luckau and a subcamp of the Sachsenhausen concentration camp were located in the town. Lübben was taken by Soviet troops of the 3rd Guards Army on 27 April 1945.

== Demography ==
Development of Population since 1875 within the Current Boundaries (Blue Line: Population; Dotted Line: Comparison to Population Development of Brandenburg state; Grey Background: Time of Nazi rule; Red Background: Time of Communist rule)

Recent Population Development and Projections; Population Development before Census 2011 (blue line); Recent Population Development according to the Census in Germany in 2011 (blue bordered line); Official projections for 2005-2030 (yellow line); for 2020-2030 (green line); for 2017-2030 (scarlet line)

Lübben (Spreewald): Population development
within the current boundaries (2017)

Year	Pop.	±% p.a.
1875	9,168	—
1890	10,140	+0.67%
1910	12,370	+1.00%
1925	11,992	−0.21%
1933	12,018	+0.03%
1939	12,337	+0.44%
1946	12,726	+0.44%
1950	12,245	−0.96%
1964	14,717	+1.32%
1971	15,274	+0.53%
1981	15,727	+0.29%
1985	15,829	+0.16%
1989	15,712	−0.19%
1990	15,495	−1.38%
1991	15,257	−1.54%

Year	Pop.	±% p.a.
1992	15,262	+0.03%
1993	15,139	−0.81%
1994	15,202	+0.42%
1995	15,091	−0.73%
1996	15,070	−0.14%
1997	15,054	−0.11%
1998	14,998	−0.37%
1999	15,095	+0.65%
2000	15,025	−0.46%
2001	14,845	−1.20%
2002	14,897	+0.35%
2003	14,807	−0.60%
2004	14,751	−0.38%
2005	14,627	−0.84%
2006	14,557	−0.48%

Year	Pop.	±% p.a.
2007	14,346	−1.45%
2008	14,250	−0.67%
2009	14,179	−0.50%
2010	14,122	−0.40%
2011	13,869	−1.79%
2012	13,815	−0.39%
2013	13,707	−0.78%
2014	13,672	−0.26%
2015	13,824	+1.11%
2016	13,861	+0.27%
2017	13,964	+0.74%
2018	14,024	+0.43%
2019	14,022	−0.01%
2020	14,036	+0.10%

== Politics ==
The municipal assembly (Stadtverordnetenversammlung) consists of 22 councillors, who were chosen in the municipal elections on 9 June 2024, and the mayor, who votes on all matters just like other members.

Distribution of the seats in the council after the elections:

Parties and voter communities		% 2024	Seats 2024	% 2019	Seats 2019	% 2014	Seats 2014	% 2008	Seats 2008
Pro Lübben	Christian Democratic Union of Germany	23,0	5	24,0	5	22,6	5	15,8	4
CDU	Christian Democratic Union of Germany	18,9	4	22,9	5	27,3	6	29,5	6
AfD	Alternative for Germany	18,7	4	-	-	-	-	-	-
Bürgerinitiative „Unser Lübben“	Citizens' Initiative "Our Lübben"	12,0	3	-	-	-	-	-	-
SPD	Social Democratic Party of Germany	11,8	2	13,4	3	21,1	5	23,6	5
Wählergemeinschaft diestadtfraktion Lübben	The city faction voters' group of Lübben	7,7	2	20,1	4	-	-	-	-
Linke	Die Linke	4,8	1	11,4	3	14,4	3	23,8	5
GREENS	Bündnis 90/Die Grünen	3,2	1	7,0	2	4,9	1	2,1	-
Einzelbewerber Sven Gratzias	Sven Gratzias (Independent)	-	-	1,1	-	-	-	-	-
Bürgerverein „wir-von-hier“	Citizens' Association "We're from here"	-	-	-	8,1	2	-	-	-
FDP	Free Democratic Party (Germany)	-	-	-	-	-	-	5,2	1
Total		100.0	37	100.0	37	100.0	37	100.0	37
Voter turnout in %		64,5		56,2		46,1		48,8	

At the constituent meeting of the city council, Peter Rogalla (diestadtfraktion) was elected chairman, his deputies are Andrea Freimann (Pro Lübben) and Inis Schönfelder (CDU).

Lübben is twinned with Wolsztyn in Poland and Neunkirchen, Saarland in Germany.

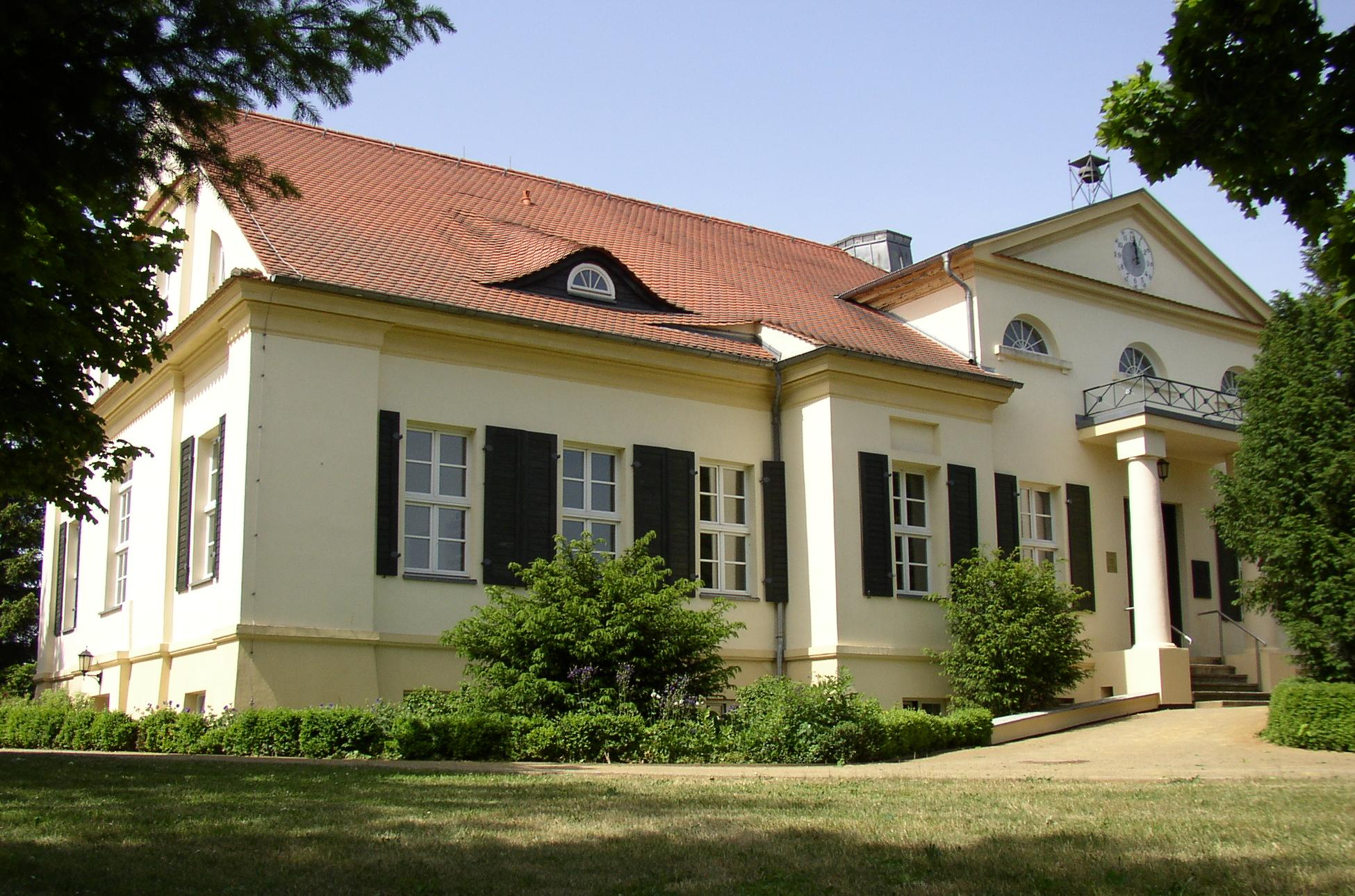
Neuhaus Manor

== Places of interest ==
- Spreewald biosphere reserve
- Lübben Castle, on medieval foundations, rebuilt in the 17th century under the rule of Duke Christian I of Saxe-Merseburg
- Neuhaus Manor in Steinkirchen, built in 1801, former residence of author Christoph Ernst von Houwald from 1822 on
- Romanesque St Pancras fieldstone church in Steinkirchen built in the early 13th century, one of the oldest preserved churches in Lower Lusatia
- Paul Gerhardt Church from the 16th century, where Paul Gerhardt preached from 1669 on
- Roman Catholic Trinity Church, built in 1862

== Notable people ==
=== Born in Lübben ===
- Hans Peter Bull (born 1936), German constitutional lawyer and jurist
- Karin Büttner-Janz (born 1952 in Hartmannsdorf), German Olympic medal winner in artistic gymnastics and habilitated doctor
- Henry Eugene Fritz (1875–1956), American painter
- Hans Walter Gruhle (1880–1958), German psychiatrist
- Benno Hann von Weyhern (1808–1890), Prussian General of the Cavalry
- Louis Klopsch (1852–1910), American author and editor of the Christian Herald
- Sylvio Kroll (born 1965), German Olympic medal winner in artistic gymnastics
- Kornelia Kunisch (born 1959), German handball player, 1980 Olympic bronze medal with the East German team
- Erich Lehmann (1890–1917), German track and field athlete
- Christian Lillinger (born 1984), German musician and composer
- Karl Otto von Manteuffel (1806-1879), German politician, Prussian agriculture minister
- Otto Theodor von Manteuffel (1805–1882), German politician, Minister-President of Prussia
- Rudolf Marloth (1855–1931), South African botanist, pharmacist and analytical chemist
- Ella Mensch (1859–1935), German writer, journalist, teacher, feminist and editor
- Richard Constantin Noschke (1867–1945), diary of his World War I Alexandra Palace internment sufferings in Imperial War Museum, London.
- Benjamin Raschke (born 1982), German politician, member of the Landtag of Brandenburg
- Thorsten Rund (born 1976), German cyclist
- Kathrin Schneider (born 1962), German politician
- Carl Siegemund Schönebeck (1758–1806), German composer and cellist
- Axel Schreiber (1977–2026), German actor
- Lavinia Schulz (1896–1924), German dancer and actress
- Ingo Spelly (born 1966), East German-German sprint canoer, Olympic champion
- Heinrich von Trebra (1830–1863), German American soldier and military officer

=== Related to Lübben ===
- Wolfgang Figulus (c. 1525 – c. 1591), German composer and teacher, 1545 or 1546 cantor in Lübben
- Paul Gerhardt (1607–1676), German hymn writer, 1668 until his death archdeacon of Lübben
- Renate Holm (1931–2022), German-Austrian film actress and operatic soprano, school in Lübben
- Christoph Ernst von Houwald (1778–1845), German dramatist and author, died at Neuhaus
- Götz von Houwald (1913–2001), German diplomat, historian and ethnographer, completed his secondary education in Lübben
- Albert Naumann (1875–1952), German fencer, died in Lübben
- Jens Riewa (born 1963), German television presenter and broadcast news analyst for the Tagesschau, grew up in Lübben
- Immanuel Johann Gerhard Scheller (1735–1803), German classical philologist and lexicographer, teacher in Lübben
- Daniel Ziebig (born 1983), German footballer, used to live in Lübben
- We Butter the Bread with Butter, German deathcore band formed in 2007
