= The Poor Musician =

1847 novella by Franz Grillparzer

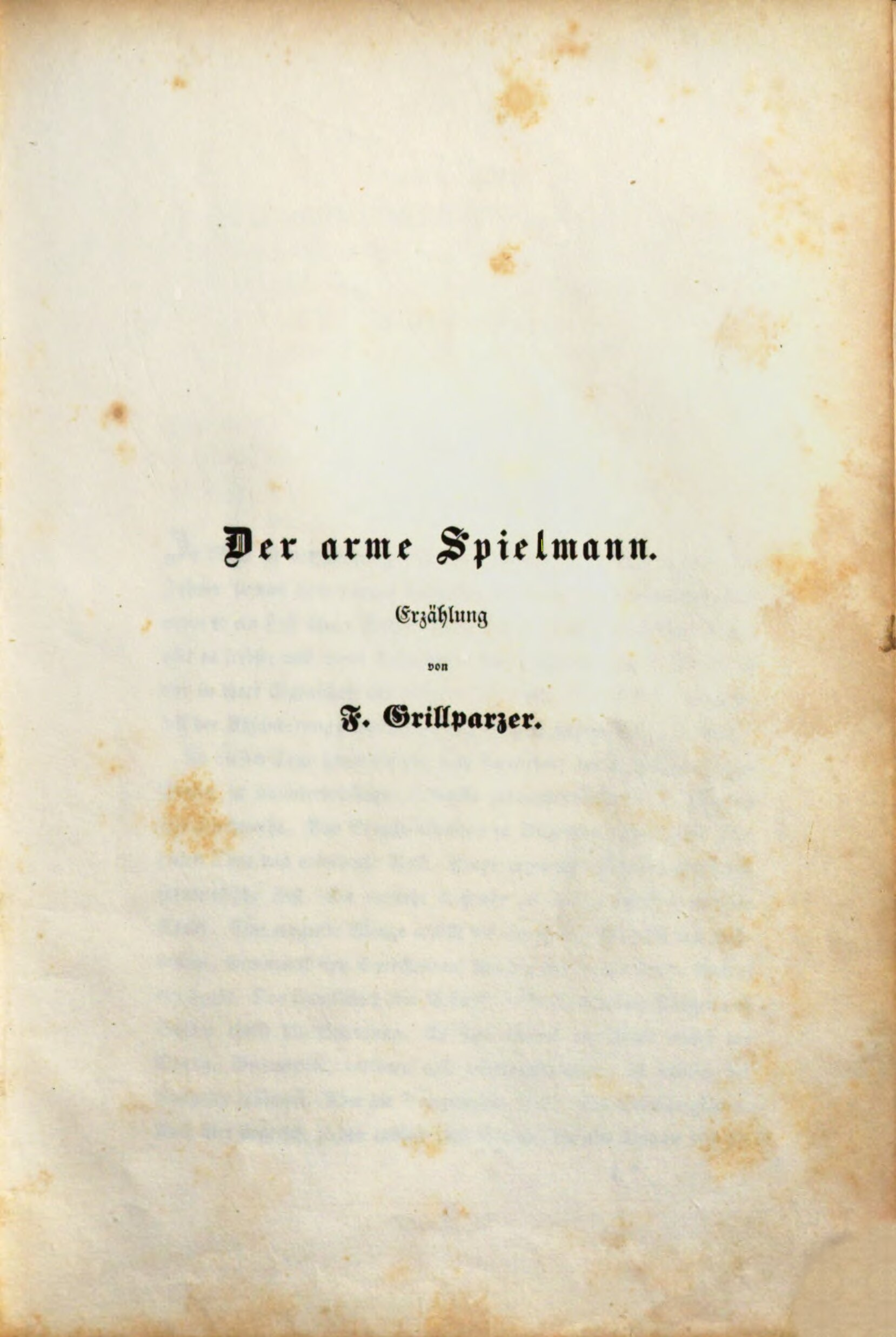
- Title page from Iris
- Author: Franz Grillparzer
- Original title: Der arme Spielmann
- Language: German
- Publisher: Gustav Heckenast
- Publication date: 1847
- Publication place: Austria
- English publication date: 1914
- Pages: 54

The Poor Musician (German: Der arme Spielmann) is an 1847 novella by the Austrian writer Franz Grillparzer. Set in a Vienna suburb, it is about the encounter between the narrator, who is a worldly successful and open-minded dramatist, and the old street musician Jakob, whose career and love life have been failures. The story's structure is close to that of a sonata.

Grillparzer began to write the story in 1831 and returned to it and finished it in 1842. It was first printed in Iris. Deutscher Almanach für 1848, published in 1847 by Gustav Heckenast in Pest. English translations include Alfred Remy's from 1914, J. F. Hargreaves' and J. G. Cummings' from 1965 and Alexander and Elizabeth Henderson's from 1969 as The Poor Fiddler.

It is one of Grillparzer's most celebrated and persistently popular works. Adalbert Stifter praised it as a masterpiece. It has been the subject of many studies and interpretations from various angles. Both the narrator and the musician have been interpreted as self-portraits, highlighting different sides of Grillparzer's person and career.
