= Hedwig Kettler =

German writer and feminist

Hedwig Friederike Karoline Auguste Kettler (19 September 1851 – 5 January 1937) was a German women's rights activist, writer and education reformer. She campaigned for equal educational opportunities for boys and girls, and led the effort to establish the first girls' high school (Gymnasium) in Germany.

== Biography ==
Hedwig Reder was born in Harburg (now part of Hamburg), in 1851, and grew up in Osnabrück. Her parents were Gustav Reder, a railway officer, and Hedwig Elisabeth Brüning. She married Julius Kettler, her cousin, in 1880; they had two children together. The Kettler family lived in Weimar and relocated to Hanover in 1893, when Julius was hired to direct the city's statistical office.

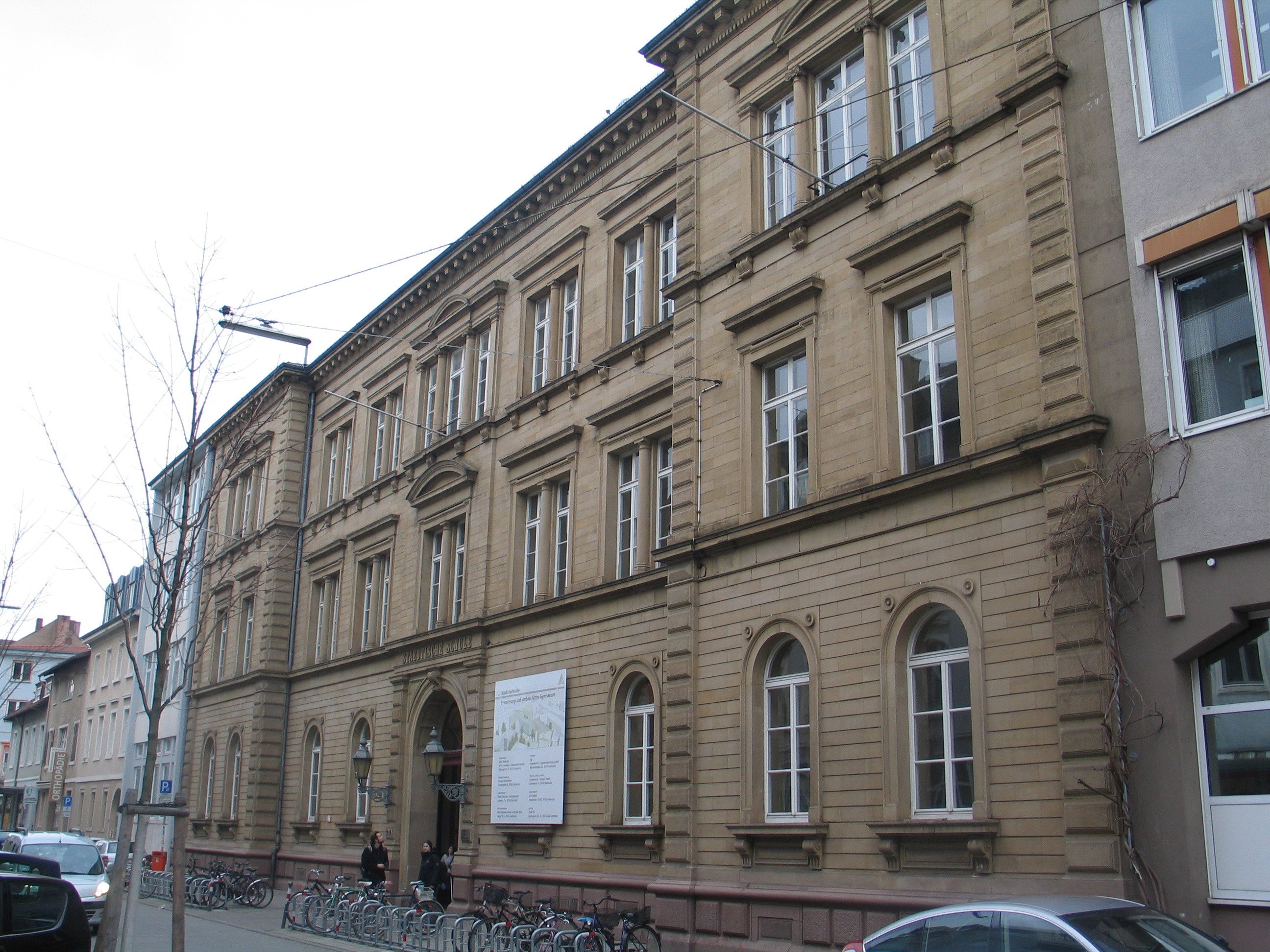
Initial building for the first girls Gymnasium in Germany

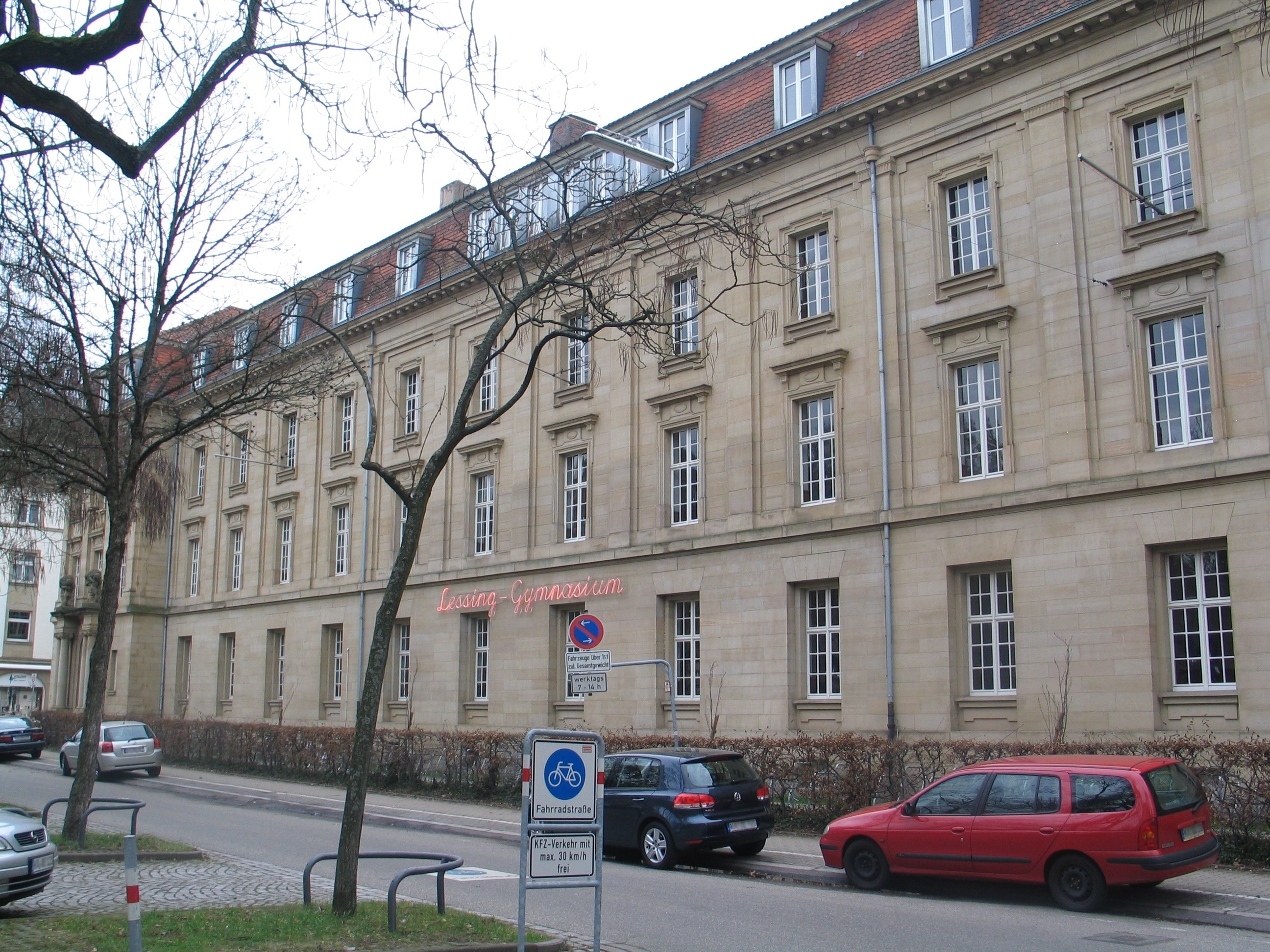
Lessing-Gymnasium in Karlsruhe, the first school of higher education for girls in Germany

Kettler advocated for the treatment of men and women as intellectual equals and for the right of girls to the same educational opportunities offered to boys. In 1881, she founded the magazine Frauenberuf: Monatsschrift für die Interessen der Frauenfrage (Female profession: monthly for the interests of women's issues), to which she was the sole contributor, and in 1887, she began publishing Bibliothek der Frauenfrage (Library of women's issues). With a group of other women, in 1888, she established the Deutscher Frauenverein Reform (German Women's association for reform), which campaigned for equal education for males and females. In 1893, the organisation, which had been renamed Verein Frauenbildungsreform (Association for the reform of women's education), led by Kettler, founded Germany's first Gymnasium (equivalent to high school) for girls in Karlsruhe, the Lessing-Gymnasium, Karlsruhe. She assisted in founding the second German girls' high school in Hanover in 1899.

Kettler withdrew her education reform efforts in 1901 when she became disillusioned with her peers in the Verein Frauenbildungsreform. She focused instead on writing, contributing short stories to various magazines and publishing two books, Alltagsgeschichten (Everyday Stories) and Skizzen (Sketches). She wrote under the pseudonyms Johanna Kettler and Gotthard Kurland. She retired in Berlin, where she died in 1937.
