= Franz Grillparzer =

Austrian writer (1791–1872)

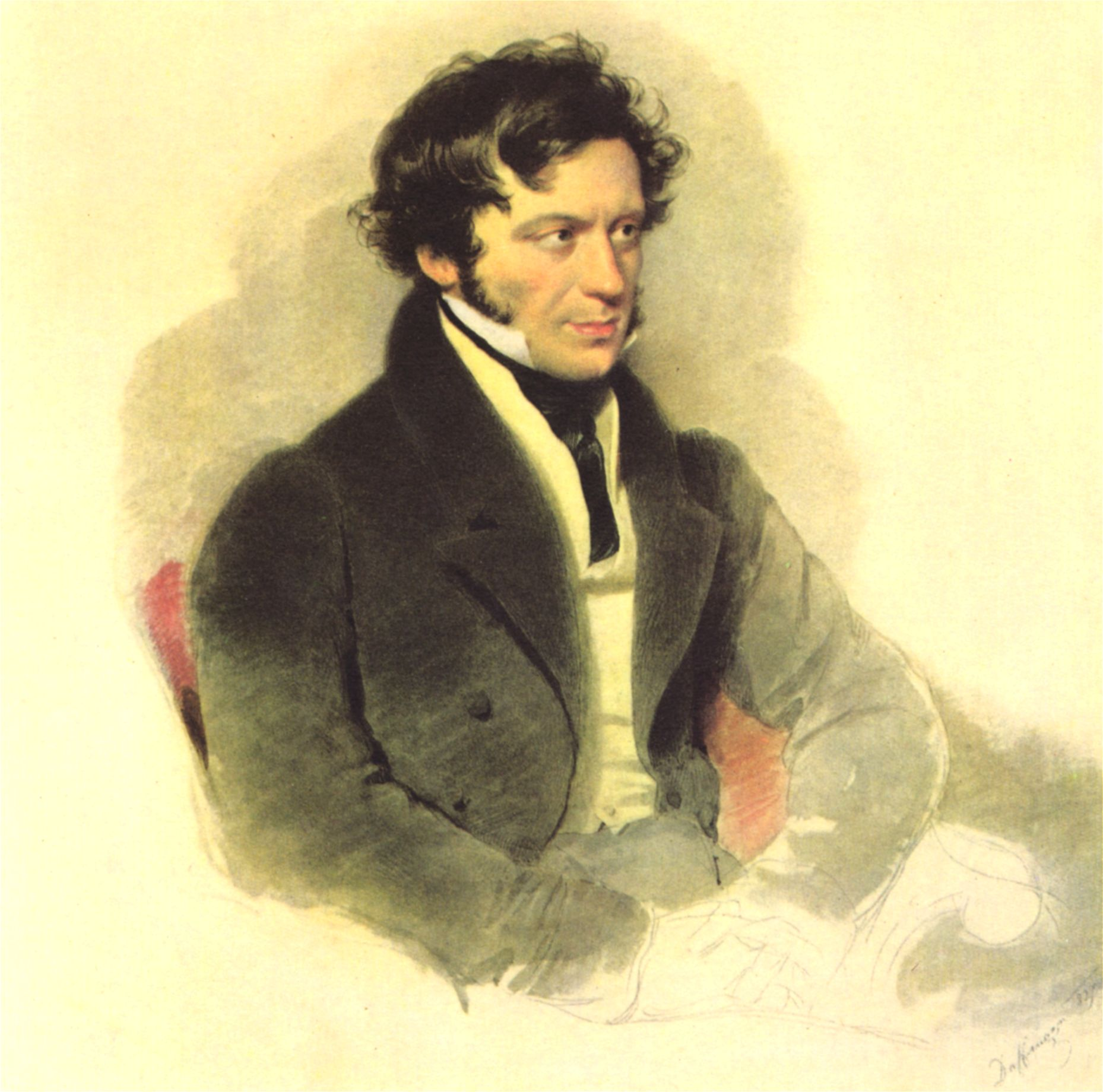
- Portrait by Moritz Michael Daffinger, 1827
- Born: 15 January 1791; Vienna, Austrian Empire
- Died: 21 January 1872 (aged 81); Vienna, Austria-Hungary
- Resting place: Hietzing Cemetery
- Education: University of Vienna
- Occupation: Dramatist
- Writing career
- Language: Austrian German
- Period: 1817 – 1872
- Notable works: Sappho; Family Strife in Hapsburg; The Golden Fleece; Blanche of Castile; King Ottocar: His Rise and Fall; The Ancestress; Libussa; The Waves of Sea and Love; A Dream is Life; The Jewess of Toledo

Signature
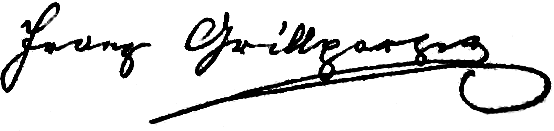

Franz Seraphicus Grillparzer (German: [ˌfʁant͡s ˈɡʁɪlˌpaʁt͡sɐ] 15 January 1791 – 21 January 1872) was an Austrian writer who was considered to be the leading Austrian dramatist of the 19th century. His plays were and are frequently performed at the Burgtheater in Vienna. He also wrote the oration for his longtime friend Ludwig van Beethoven's funeral, as well as the epitaph for his friend Franz Schubert.

Though he wrote during the period of Romanticism, Grillparzer's poetic language owes far more to the period of Classicism which reigned during his formative years. Committed to the classical ideals of aesthetic beauty and morality, his plots shy away from the realism which developed during his time, preferring instead to use the theater to address spiritual values, which in the words of the dying queen of his Libussa, would only come after the period of Materialism had passed. Due to the identity-creating use of his works, especially after World War II, he was named as the national poet of Austria.

== Life and career ==
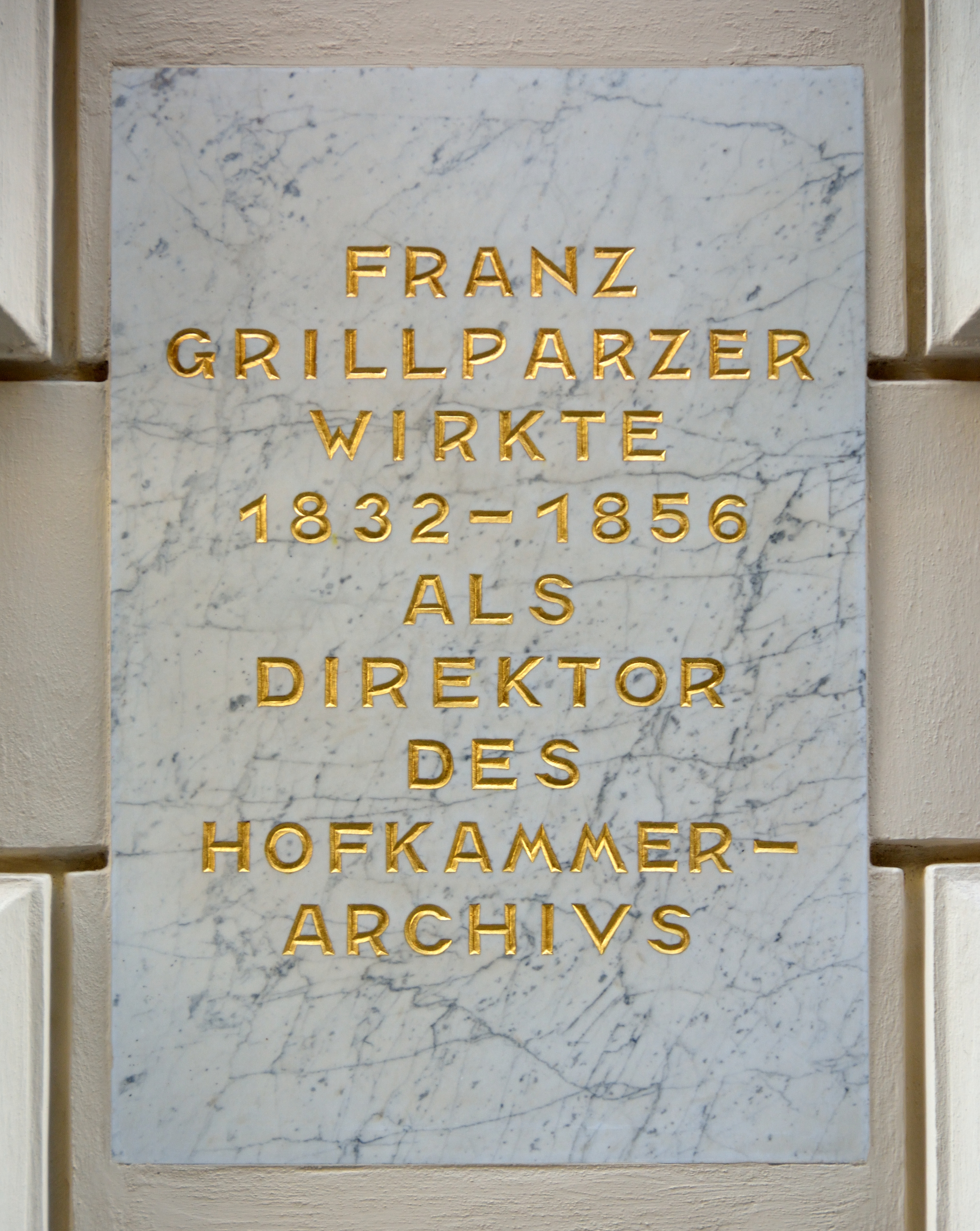
Plaque commemorating Franz Grillparzer acting as director of the Hofkammerarchiv, Johannesgasse 6, 1st district of Vienna

Franz Grillparzer was born in Vienna, Austria. His father, the unsuccessful lawyer E. J. Grillparzer, whose fortunes were ruined by Napoleon's invasion, was a severe pedant and a staunch upholder of the liberal traditions of the reign of Joseph II. His mother, Anna Franziska, was a nervous, highly-strung woman, daughter of Christoph Sonnleithner, sister to Joseph and Ignaz, aunt to Leopold.

Franz's father wished him to become a lawyer, and he entered the University of Vienna in 1807 as a student of jurisprudence. Two years later his father died, leaving the family in difficult circumstances. After obtaining his degree from the university in 1811, Franz became a private tutor for a noble family; then in 1813, he entered the civil service as a clerk at the Imperial Hofkammer (Exchequer) in Austria. In 1821, he unsuccessfully applied to the position of scribe at the Imperial Library, and later that same year, he was relocated to the Ministry of Finance. In 1832, he became director of the archives at the Imperial Hofkammer, a position he held until his retirement in 1856. Grillparzer had little capacity for an official career and regarded his position merely as a means of independence.

From early youth, Grillparzer displayed a strong literary impulse. He devoted especial attention to the Spanish drama, and many of his works show the influence of Pedro Calderón de la Barca. In 1853, he wrote an autobiography of his life and times from birth to 1836. Among his posthumous writings are many fragments of literary, philosophic, and political criticism, all of them indicating a strong and independent spirit, not invariably just, but distinct, penetrating, and suggestive.

It is characteristic of him that he expresses extreme dislike of Hegel's philosophy on the ground that its terms are unintelligible. On the other hand, he gives evidence of careful and sympathetic study of Immanuel Kant. Of modern literary critics, Gervinus was most repugnant to him, mainly because of the tendency of this writer to attribute moral aims to authors who created solely for art's sake. He rather maliciously says that Gervinus had one advantage and one disadvantage in writing his history of German literature – the advantage of common sense, the disadvantage of knowing nothing of his subject.

Of a quiet contemplative nature, Grillparzer shunned general society. He never married. He could seem cold and distant to strangers, but in conversation with people he liked, his real disposition revealed itself; his manner became animated, his eyes brightened, and a sarcastic but not ill-natured smile would play upon his lips. He often said that the art of writing poetry can neither be taught nor learned, but he also held that inspiration will not visit a poet who neglects to make himself master of his subject. Hence before writing a play he worked hard, striving to comprehend the spirit of the age he wished to represent. He was exceedingly fond of travel, and at different times visited all the leading European countries.

After 1840, when his only comedy was rejected by the public, he almost passed from the memory of his contemporaries. Fortunately for him, his admirer Heinrich Laube became artistic director of Vienna's court theater in 1849. Laube staged productions of Grillparzer's forgotten works, and their success was immediate and profound. To his own surprise, Grillparzer became the most popular author of the day; he was ranked with Goethe and Schiller, and lauded as the national poet of Austria. On his eightieth birthday, all classes from the court downwards united to do him honour; never, probably, did Vienna exert herself so much to prove her respect for a private citizen.

He was buried in 1872 with an amount of ceremony that surpassed even the pomp displayed at the funeral of poet Friedrich Gottlieb Klopstock in 1803. He was originally buried in the Währinger Cemetery in Vienna, now known as Schubertpark. He now lies at Hietzing Cemetery.

== Early works up to Das goldene Vlies ==
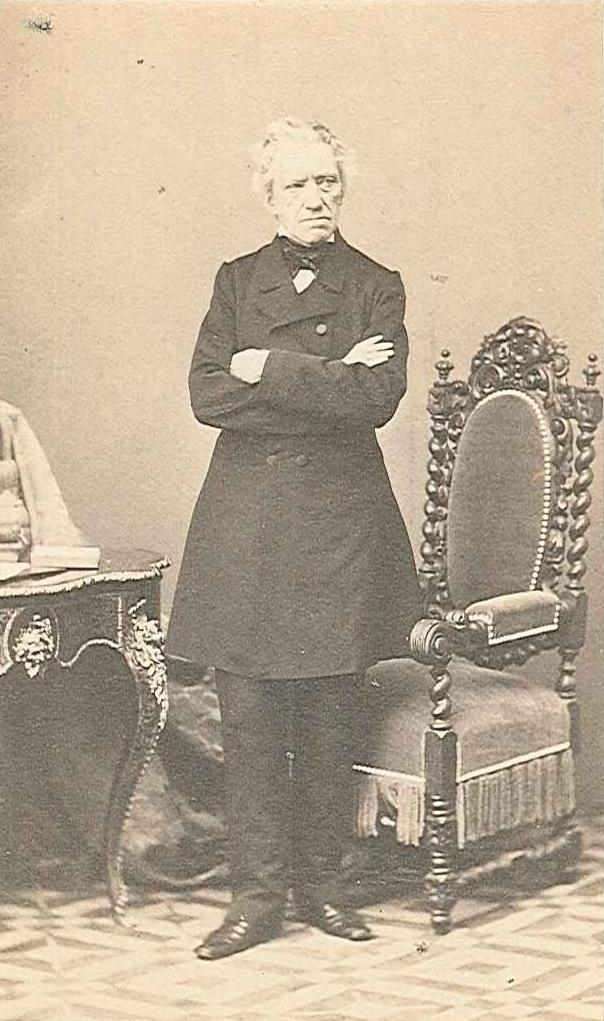
Franz Grillparzer, photography by Ludwig Angerer

From 1807 to 1809, Grillparzer wrote a long tragedy in iambics, Blanca von Castilien, modeled on Schiller's Don Carlos. He also produced the dramatic fragments Spartacus and Alfred der Grosse (1809).

When Grillparzer began to write, the German stage was dominated by the wild plays of Zacharias Werner, Adolf Müllner, and other authors of so-called "fate-tragedies." Grillparzer's play The Ancestress (German: Die Ahnfrau), published in 1816, reflected this trend. It is a gruesome fate-tragedy in the trochaic measure of the Spanish drama, already made popular by Müllner's Schuld. The ghost of a lady who was killed by her husband for infidelity is doomed to walk the earth until her family line dies out, and this happens in the play amid scenes of violence and horror. Its general character is similar to that of Werner's dramas; it only differs from them in containing individual passages of much force and beauty. It reveals an instinct for dramatic as opposed to merely theatrical effect, which distinguishes it from other fate-dramas of the day. Its success led to the poet being classed for the best part of his life with playwrights like Müllner and Christoph Ernst von Houwald. In 1817, the first performances of The Ancestress made Grillparzer famous.

Grillparzer followed this gothic drama with Sappho (1818), a drama of a very different type. Similar to Goethe's Torquato Tasso, Grillparzer dramatized the tragedy of poetic genius, showing how a poet must renounce earthly happiness to fulfill a higher mission. After reading an Italian translation of this play, Lord Byron expressed his conviction that Grillparzer would be held in reverence by posterity. Grillparzer's conceptions are not so clearly defined as Goethe's, nor is his diction so varied and harmonious; but the play has the stamp of genius, and ranks as one of the best works that attempt to combine the passion and sentiment of modern life with the simplicity and grace of ancient masterpieces.

In 1821, Grillparzer completed his The Golden Fleece trilogy, a project that had been interrupted in 1819 when his depressed mother committed suicide, and by Grillparzer's subsequent visit to Italy. The trilogy opens with a one-act prelude, Der Gastfreund, then depicts, in The Argonauts (Die Argonauten) Jason's adventures in his quest for the Fleece. Medea, a tragedy of classic proportions, contains the culminating events of the story of Medea, which had been so often dramatized before. Similarly to Sappho but on a larger scale, this trilogy is a tragedy of the heart's desire, the conflict of the simple happy life with that sinister power, be it genius or ambition, which upsets the equilibrium of life. There is delicate art in the delineation of the mingled fascination and repulsion which Medea and Jason feel for each other, and when at last repulsion becomes the dominant force, Grillparzer gives splendid utterance to Medea's rage. At the end, Medea bears the fatal Fleece back to Delphi, while Jason is left to realize the futility of human striving and earthly happiness. The end is bitter disillusionment; the only consolation renunciation. Some critics consider Medea Grillparzer's highest achievement.

== Historical tragedies ==
For his historical tragedy King Ottocar: His Rise and Fall (German: König Ottokars Glück und Ende, written 1823, but owing to difficulties with the censor, not performed until February 19, 1825), Grillparzer dramatized the conflict of Ottokar II of Bohemia with Rudolph I of Germany. It appealed strongly to the patriotic sympathies of the Viennese, because it depicted one of the proudest periods of Austrian history, the founding of the House of Habsburg. With an almost modern realism Grillparzer reproduced the medieval era, at the same time not losing sight of the needs of the theatre. It cannot be said that the materials of the play are welded into a compact whole, but the characters are vigorously conceived, and there is a fine dramatic contrast between the brilliant, restless, and unscrupulous Ottocar and the calm, upright, and ultimately triumphant Rudolph. Because Ottocar is defeated, critics argue that this play represents another work in which Grillparzer preaches the futility of endeavour and the vanity of worldly greatness.

A second historical tragedy, A faithful Servant of his Lord (Ein treuer Diener seines Herrn), 1826, performed 1828), attempted to illustrate a more heroic theme; but the subject of the superhuman self-effacement of Bancbanus before his lord Duke Otto of Meran proved too uncompromising an illustration of Kant's categorical imperative of duty to be palatable in the theatre. Liberal critics accused Grillparzer of promoting servility. At the same time, the play displeased the court, and its presentation was stopped. It hardly deserved to be made the subject of so much contention, for it is one of the least powerful of Grillparzer's later dramas.

With these historical tragedies began the darkest decade of Grillparzer's life. They brought him into conflict with the Austrian censor – a conflict that grated on Grillparzer's sensitive soul, and was aggravated by his own position as a servant of the state. In 1826, he paid a visit to Goethe in Saxe-Weimar, and was able to compare the enlightened conditions of Weimar with the censorship of Vienna.

To these troubles were added personal worries. In the winter of 1820/1821, Grillparzer had met and fallen in love with Katharina Fröhlich (1801–1879), but whether owing to a presentiment of mutual incompatibility, or merely owing to Grillparzer's conviction that life had no happiness in store for him, he shrank from marriage. Nevertheless, he was plunged into an abyss of misery and despair to which his diary bears heart-rending witness; his sufferings found poetic expression in the cycle of poems called Tristia ex Ponto (1835).

== More masterpieces and a setback ==
Still, during this time, Grillparzer completed two of his greatest dramas, Waves of the Sea and of Love (German: Des Meeres und der Liebe Wellen, 1831) and The Dream, a Life (Der Traum ein Leben, 1834). Waves of the Sea and of Love dramatizes the story of Hero and Leander, as a poetic love-tragedy with an insight into character motivation that predates the psychological dramas of Ibsen. The work again is formed on classic models, but in this instance his feeling is so distinctly modern that it does not find adequate expression in Grillparzer's carefully measured verse. The subject has never been more happily treated than in some passages, which, however, are marked rather by lyrical than dramatic qualities. The poetic influence of Lope de Vega and Pedro Calderón de la Barca is also evident.

The Dream, a Life, Grillparzer's technical masterpiece, is in form perhaps even more influenced by Spanish drama; it is also more of what Goethe called a confession. The aspirations of Rustan, an ambitious young peasant, are reflected in the hero's dream, which takes up nearly three acts of the play. Ultimately Rustan awakens from his nightmare to realize the truth of Grillparzer's own pessimistic belief that all earthly ambitions and aspirations are vanity; the only true happiness is contentment with one's lot and inner peace. It was the first of Grillparzer's dramas that did not end tragically. Grillparzer provided the text for Schubert's 'Mirjams Siegesgesang' (Miriam's Song of Triumph), Op. 136/D. 942.

In 1838 Grillparzer produced his only comedy, Woe to him who lies (German: Weh dem, der lügt). But Woe to him who lies, in spite of its humour of situation, its sparkling dialogue and its original premise — a hero who wins by invariably telling the truth, where his enemies invariably expect him to lie – was too strange to meet with approval in its day. Its premiere on 6 March 1838 was a failure. This was a severe blow to the poet, who turned his back forever on the German theatre.

== Later life and final masterpieces ==
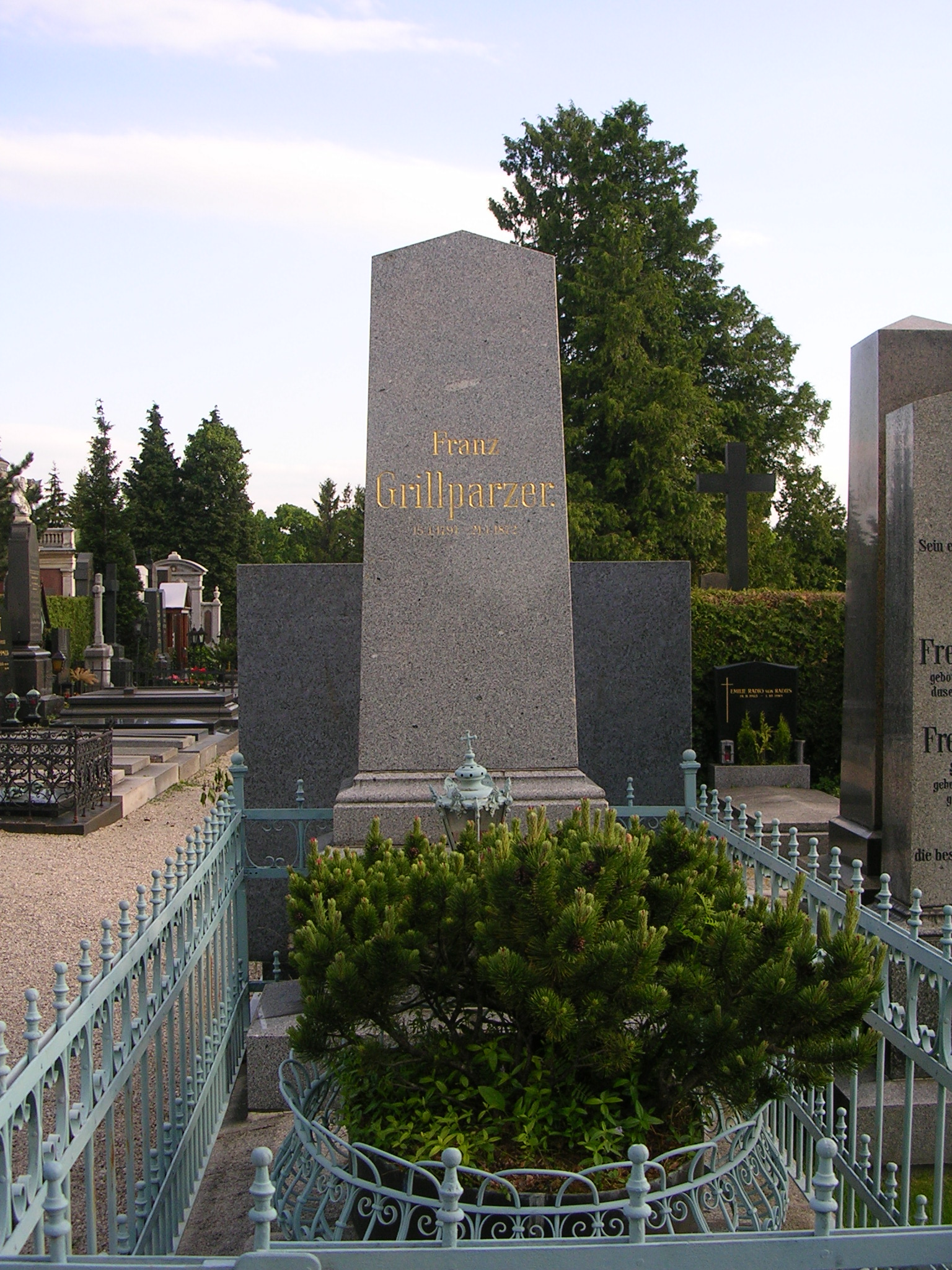
Franz Grillparzer's tomb

In 1836, Grillparzer paid a visit to Paris and London, in 1843 to Athens and Constantinople. Then came the Revolution which struck off the intellectual fetters under which Grillparzer and his contemporaries had groaned in Austria, but the liberation came too late for him. Honours were heaped upon him; he was made a member of the Academy of Sciences; Heinrich Laube, as director of the Burgtheater, reinstated his plays into the repertory; in 1861, he was elected to the Austrian Herrenhaus; his eightieth birthday was a national festival, and when he died in Vienna, on 21 January 1872, the mourning of the Austrian people was universal.

With the exception of a beautiful fragment, Esther (1861), Grillparzer published no more dramatic poetry after the fiasco of Weh dem, der lügt, but at his death three completed tragedies were found among his papers. Of these, The Jewess of Toledo (Die Jüdin von Toledo, written in 1851), an admirable adaptation from the Spanish, has won a permanent place in the German classical repertory; Ein Bruderzwist in Habsburg is a powerful historical tragedy and Libussa is perhaps the most mature, as it is certainly the deepest, of all Grillparzer's dramas; the latter two plays prove how much was lost by the poet's divorce from the theatre.

== Assessment ==
Grillparzer was an important figure in the Viennese theater of the 1840s when his greatest dramatic works were produced. Together with Christian Friedrich Hebbel, he rates as the most influential dramatist of the mid-nineteenth century. While most of his best plays originate in the age of Romanticism, his works could not be classified as Romantic. His language and characters reflect the earlier sensibilities of neo-classicism, exhibited in plays like Sappho and Das goldene Vlies which treats the subject matter of Jason bringing Medea back to Greece. In these plays he deals with classical themes as well as subject matter. One important characteristic of the age is that aesthetic beauty and virtue are seen as interrelated. In his historical plays like König Ottokars Glück und Ende, he expresses the Enlightenment optimism that humankind can put its affairs in order and realize an age of peace an harmony. This is a common theme in Austrian thought from this period. Some have suggested that this is a reflection of their multi-ethnic Austrian state. Ottkar, the thirteenth century Bohemian king, wants to subjugate his neighbors, a thinly veiled reference to the recently defeated Napoleon. However, the play ends on an upbeat note.

Although Grillparzer was essentially a dramatist, his lyric poetry is in the intensity of its personal note hardly inferior to Lenau's; and the bitterness of his later years found vent in biting and stinging epigrams that spared few of his greater contemporaries. As a prose writer, he has left one powerful novella, The Poor Musician (Der arme Spielmann, 1848), and a volume of critical studies on the Spanish drama, which shows how completely he had succeeded in identifying himself with the Spanish point of view.

Grillparzer's brooding, unbalanced temperament, his lack of will-power, his pessimistic renunciation and the bitterness which his self-imposed martyrdom produced in him, made him peculiarly adapted to express the mood of Austria in the epoch of intellectual thraldom that lay between the Napoleonic Wars and the Revolution of 1848.

== Legacy and cultural references ==
- He is honoured in Austria with a pastry, the Grillparzer Torte.
- Outside Austria, the modern American reader is perhaps most familiar with Grillparzer via disparaging references to him in the popular John Irving novel The World According to Garp. The book features a story within a story entitled The Pension Grillparzer. Grillparzer is also referenced in Irving's novel A Son of the Circus, in which the protagonist had studied in Vienna.
- He is mentioned in the W. G. Sebald novel Vertigo.
- In the tenth of the German language film series, Die Zweite Heimat by Edgar Reitz, Reinhard and Esther read from a Grillparzer poem comparing the half moon to an incomplete, ambiguous life.
- In Vienna's Inner City, Grillparzerstraße (Vienna) was named after him in 1873. There is also a Grillparzerstraße in several other cities, including Graz, Linz, Salzburg, Innsbruck, Berlin, Dresden, Freiburg / Br., Hamburg, Mannheim and Munich. Double designations in Vienna resulting from incorporations were withdrawn.
- After his death, a monument was erected in the Volksgarten in Vienna; also by Leopold Schrödl in Baden.
- His portrait adorned the 100 Schilling banknote from 1954. The Mint Austria minted a 25 Schilling commemorative coin (bust picture) in 1964 and a 20 Schilling course coin (bust picture and Burgtheater ) in 1991 .
- The Austrian Post issued four occasions (1931, 1947, 1972 and 1991) special stamps with portraits of the writer.
- The Grillparzer Prize and the Grillparzer Ring were named after him.
- The asteroid 30933 was named Grillparzer in his honor.
- In Linz and in St. Pölten, elementary schools are named after him.
- In "The World According to Garp" by John Irving, the name Grillparzer is referenced through a story within the novel titled "The Pension Grillparzer." This story is part of the narrative created by the main character, T.S. Garp.
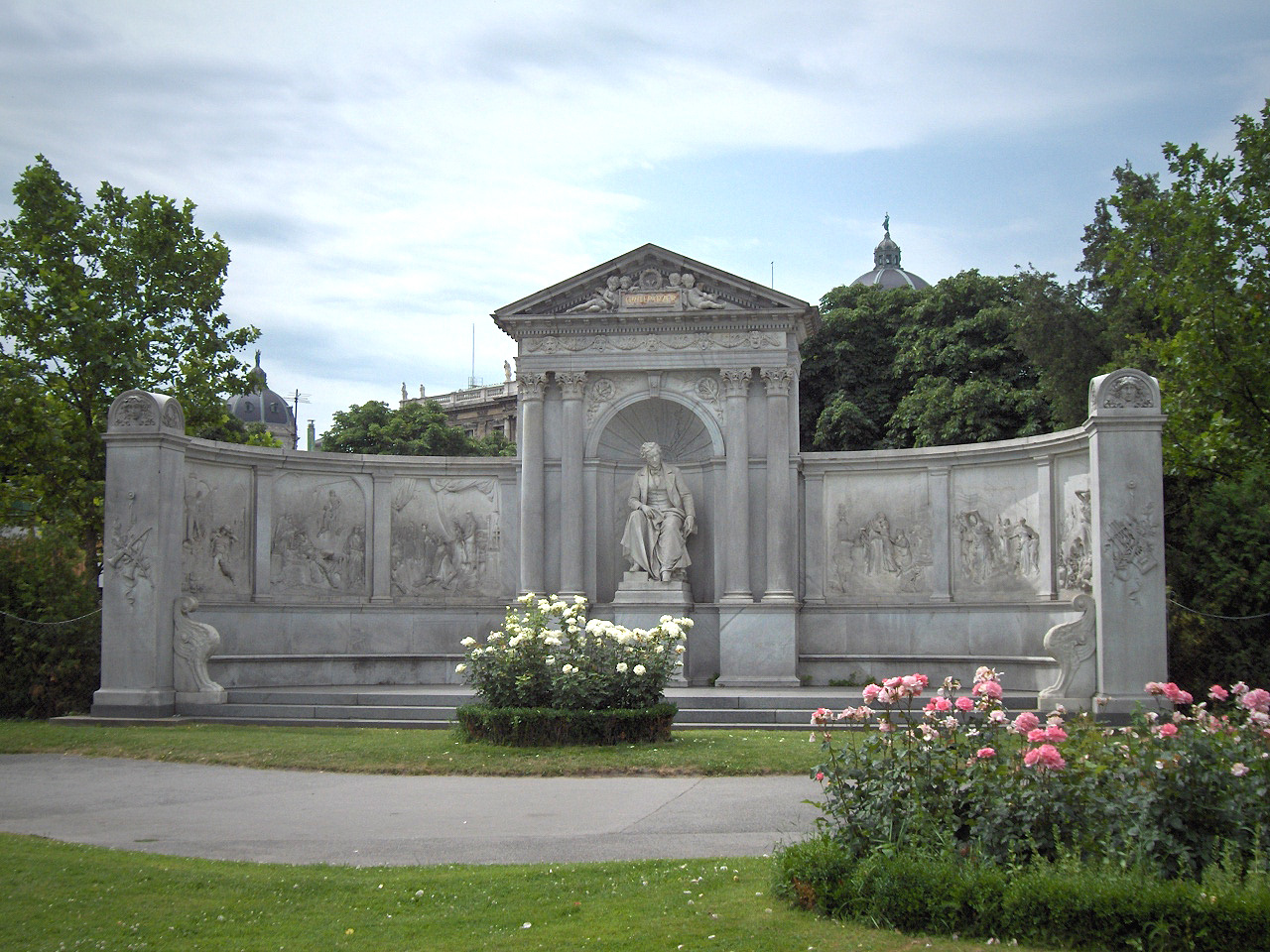
Monument in the Volksgarten, Vienna, Austria

== Works ==
=== Dramas ===
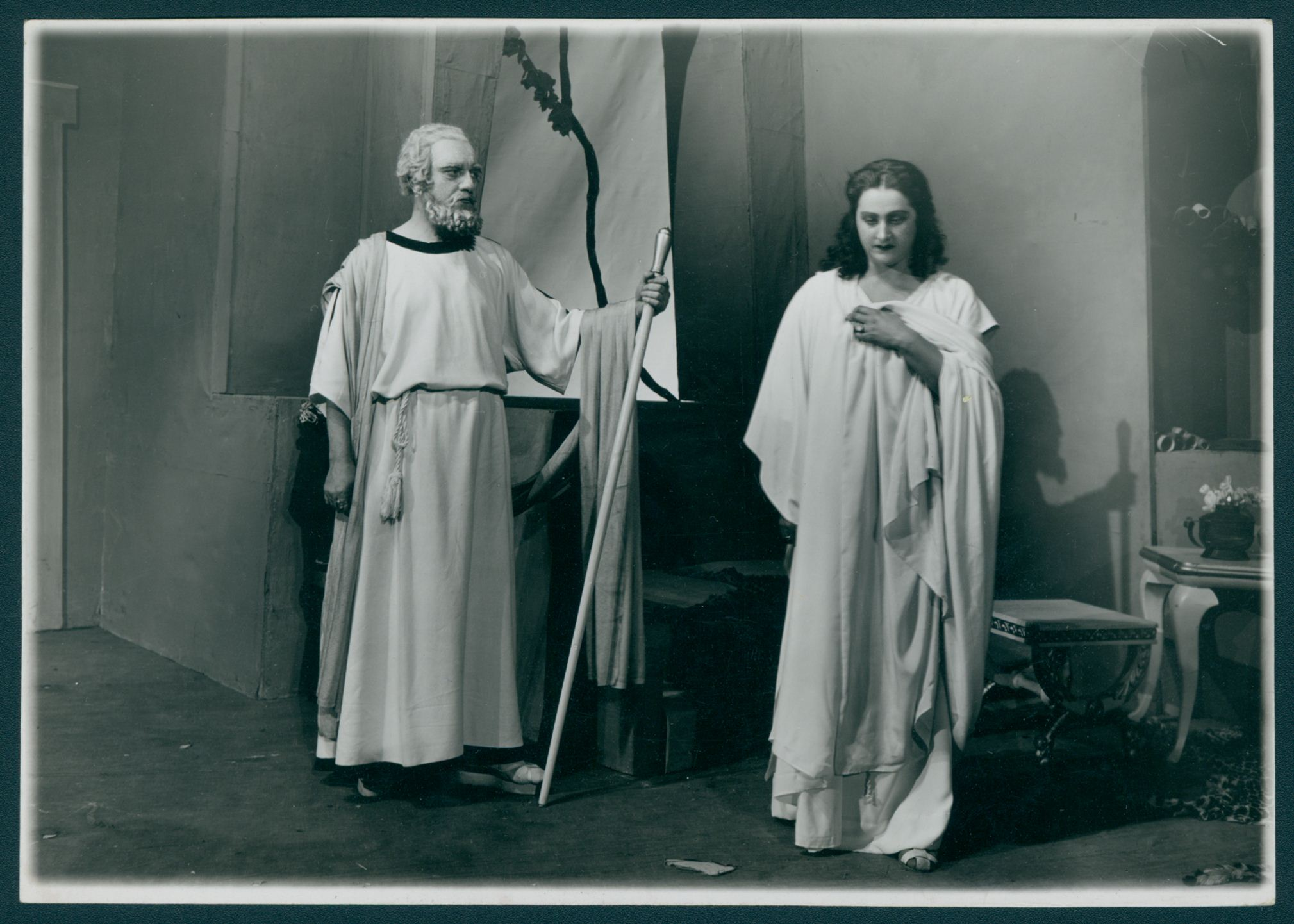
Des Meeres und der Liebe Wellen, director Nikolay Masalitinov

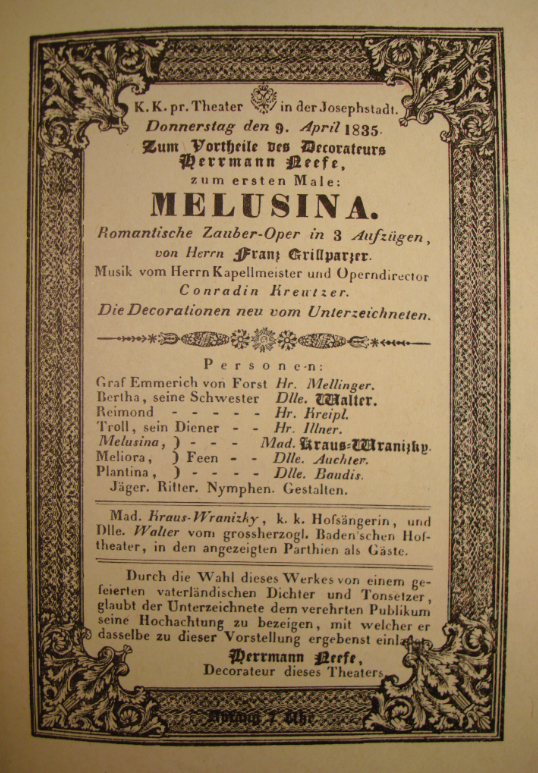
Poster of the play Melusina, “Romantic magic opera” in 3 acts, libretto by Franz Grillparzer, music by Conradin Kreutzer (Representation of April 9, 1835).

- Blanka von Kastilien (Blanche of Castile, 1807–09)
- Spartakus (Spartacus, 1809)
- Alfred der Große (Alfred the Great, 1809)
- Die Ahnfrau (1817)
- Sappho (1818)
- The Golden Fleece (1821), trilogy consisting of
  - Der Gastfreund
  - Die Argonauten
  - Medea
- Melusina (1822–23)
- König Ottokars Glück und Ende (King Ottocar: His Rise and Fall, 1823)
- Ein treuer Diener seines Herrn (1826)
- Des Meeres und der Liebe Wellen (1831)
- Der Traum ein Leben (1834)
- Tristia ex Ponto (1835)
- Weh dem, der lügt (1838)
- Libussa (1848)
- Ein Bruderzwist im Hause Habsburg (1848)
- Die Jüdin von Toledo (The Jewess of Toledo, 1851)
- Esther (a fragment, 1861)

=== Novellas ===
- Das Kloster bei Sendomir (1827)
- Der arme Spielmann (1848)

== See also ==
- List of Austrian writers
- List of Austrians
- Jenny Weleminsky, who translated Sappho and several of Grillparzer's poems into Esperanto
