= Christoph Ernst von Houwald =

German dramatist and author

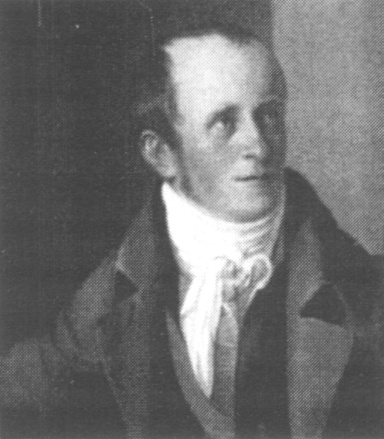
- Christoph Ernst von Houwald
- Born: 28 November 1778; Straupitz
- Died: 28 January 1845 (aged 66)
- Occupations: dramatist and author

Christoph Ernst, Freiherr von Houwald (German pronunciation: [ˈhuːvalt]; 28 November 1778 – 28 January 1845) was a German dramatist and writer.

== Life ==
Houwald was born at Straupitz in Lower Lusatia, a son of the president of the district court of justice. He studied law at the university of Halle, and on completion of his academic studies returned home, married, and managed the family estates. In 1816 he afforded a home to his friend Karl Wilhelm Salice-Contessa (1777–1825), himself a poet, who had met with serious reverses of fortune; Contessa lived with Houwald, assisting and stimulating him in his literary work, for eight years. In 1821 Houwald was unanimously elected syndic for Lower Lusatia, an office which placed him at the head of the administration of the province. He died at Neuhaus, near Lübben, on 28 January 1845.

== Work ==
Houwald was gifted with talents for poetry and the drama. He is remembered as the author of several so-called "Fate tragedies", of which the best known are Das Bild, Der Leuchtturm, Die Heimkehr, Fluch und Segen (all published in 1821). They have, however, small literary value, and Houwald is seen to better advantage in his narratives and books for juvenile readers, such as Romantische Akkorde (publ. by W Contessa, Berlin, 1817); Buch für Kinder gebildeter Stande (1819–1824); and Jakob Thau, der Hofnarr (1821).

Houwald's collected works, Sämtliche Werke, were published in five volumes (Leipzig, 1851; 2nd ed., 1858–1859). See J. Minor, Die Schicksalstragödie in ihren Hauptvertretern (Frankfurt, 1883), and "Das Schicksalsdrama" in Kirschner's Deutsche Nationalliteratur, vol. cli. (Stuttgart, 1884); O. Schmidtborn, C. E. von Houwald als Dramatiker (1909).
