= Sappho (play) =

1818 tragedy written by Franz Grillparzer

Sappho (1818) is a tragedy by Austrian playwright Franz Grillparzer.

== Plot ==
The plot is based on a tradition that Sappho, a poet of ancient Greece, threw herself from the high Lesbian cliffs into the sea when she found that her love for the youth Phaon was unrequited, and that he preferred her slave, named Melitta in the play, to her. In Grillparzer's play, Melitta is not in love with Phaon; her only desire is to return to the home that she was taken from. Neither Sappho or Phaon listen to her wishes; Sappho also believes that Melitta has seduced Phaon, and will not hear the former's protestations of innocence.

== Background ==
Following the success of his first great tragedy of fate, Die Ahnfrau (The Ancestress), which was written in 16 days, Franz Grillparzer wrote this second poetic drama, Sappho, also composed at white heat, and resembling Die Ahnfrau in the general character of its poetry although differing from it in form and spirit. In its conception, Sappho is halfway between a tragedy of fate and a more modern tragedy of character; in its form, too, it is halfway between the classical and the modern. An attempt is made to combine the passion and sentiment of modern life with the simplicity and grace of ancient masterpieces. Its classic spirit is much like that of Goethe's Torquato Tasso; Grillparzer unrolls the tragedy of poetic genius, the renunciation of earthly happiness imposed upon the poet by her higher mission.

== Evaluation ==
Sappho (1819), the most artistically finished of his productions. An Italian rendering of this play fell into the hands of Lord Byron, who, although the translation was very bad, expressed his conviction that the author's name would be held in reverence by posterity. It is full of the aspiration of the Romantic school, but its form is classic, and its chastened style presents a striking contrast to the noise and fury of the Ahnfrau. The problem of the play has some resemblance to that of Goethe's Torquato Tasso, for in both we find the struggles of a poetic nature which is unable to reconcile itself to the conditions of the actual world. Grillparzer's conceptions are not so clearly defined as Goethe's, nor is his diction so varied and harmonious; but the play has the stamp of genius, and ranks as one of the best of those works in which an attempt has been made to combine the passion and sentiment of modern life with the simplicity and grace of ancient masterpieces.

Sappho (1818), a drama of a very different type; in the classic spirit of Goethe’s Tasso, Grillparzer unrolled the tragedy of poetic genius, the renunciation of earthly happiness imposed upon the poet by his higher mission.

Edith J. R. Isaacs evaluates the play in the 1920 edition of Encyclopedia Americana as follows:

Grillparzer has made a stirring drama, with an acting quality strong enough to carry it to success on the stage when well performed. At the same time, he has developed a poetic symbolism in the story, and the conflict between the spiritually gifted Sappho and the beautiful Melitta becomes, in Grillparzer's hands, the conflict between art and the pleasures of life. Although the verse has neither the dignity nor the sheer beauty of some of Grillparzer's later work, notably Des Meeres und der Liebe Wellen (Waves of the Sea and of Love), it has the cumulative quality which often accompanies verse written in long stretches at a single sitting, a quality which does not detract from its distinctly dramatic value. Through the dignity and the success of his early dramas Grillparzer forged the link that bound the drama of Austria definitely to the literature of Germany.

== Sources ==
- Robertson, John George (1911). "Grillparzer, Franz" . In Chisholm, Hugh (ed.). Encyclopædia Britannica (11th ed.). Cambridge University Press.
- Sime, James (1880). "Grillparzer, Franz" . In Baynes, T. S.; Smith, W. R. (eds.). Encyclopædia Britannica. Vol. 11 (9th ed.). New York: Charles Scribner's Sons.

Attribution
