= Schubertiade =

Events to celebrate music by Franz Schubert

A Schubertiade (also spelled Schubertiad) is an event held to celebrate the music of Franz Schubert (1797–1828). Modern Schubertiades also include concert series and festivals, such as the Schubertiade Vorarlberg.

== History ==
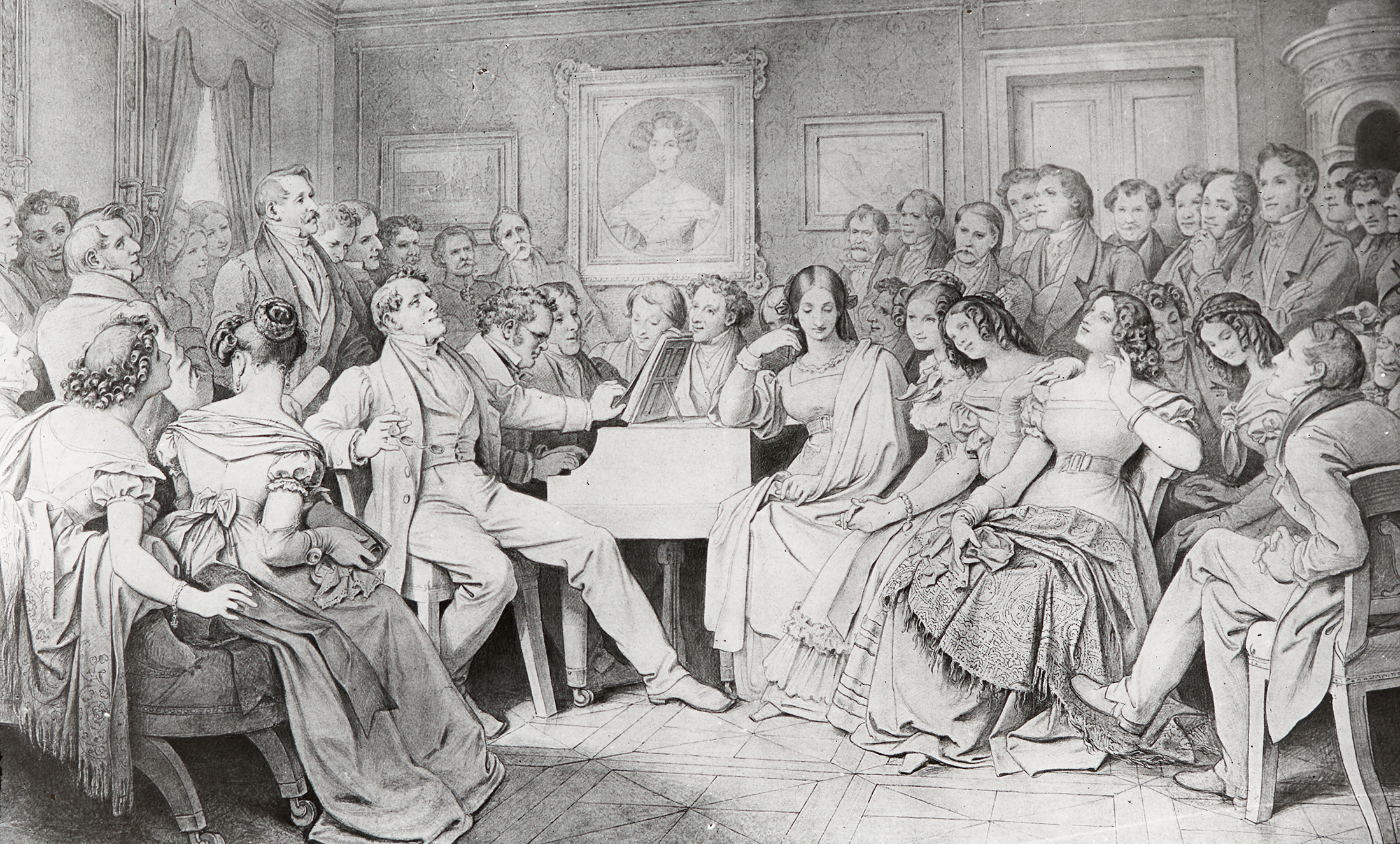
Moritz von Schwind's 1868 drawing of a Schubertiade

During Schubert's lifetime, these events were generally informal, unadvertised gatherings, held at private homes. Schubertiades in early 19th-century Vienna were typically sponsored by wealthier friends or aficionados of Schubert's music. Numerous such concerts were organised from 1815 onwards in the large apartment of the Austrian jurist and patron Ignaz von Sonnleithner in the Gundelhof (Brandstätte 5, Vienna), later also by Franz von Schober, Eduard von Bauernfeld and many others. Schubert's friend Leopold Kupelwieser claimed to hold them on his own, writing, "I treat myself to a Schubertiade now and again."

While in those years many Schubertiades included the composer's participation, accompanying notable baritones like Johann Michael Vogl on the piano, this was not necessary; they were sometimes held in places other than Vienna, where Schubert spent most of his life, and assumed the character of a literary-musical salon. In addition to Schubert's music, they often also featured poetry readings, dancing, and other sociable pastimes. Attendees numbered from a handful to over one hundred. Notable guests were Joseph Sonnleithner, Leopold von Sonnleithner, Anton von Doblhoff-Dier, Franz Grillparzer, Johann Baptist Jenger, Moritz von Schwind, Ludwig Ferdinand Schnorr von Carolsfeld, Wilhelm August Rieder, Johann Mayrhofer, Johann Gabriel Seidl, Franz Lachner, Joseph von Spaun and even Ludwig van Beethoven.

Modern Schubertiades are more likely to be formal affairs, presented as concerts or festivals devoted to Schubert's music. Since 1976 the annual Schubertiade Vorarlberg has been held in Hohenems and Schwarzenberg, initiated by the German baritone Hermann Prey. Other Schubertiades are staged in Ettlingen, Dörzbach and Schnackenburg, in Luxembourg, Biel/Bienne, and at the Vilabertran monastery in Spain.

== Depictions ==
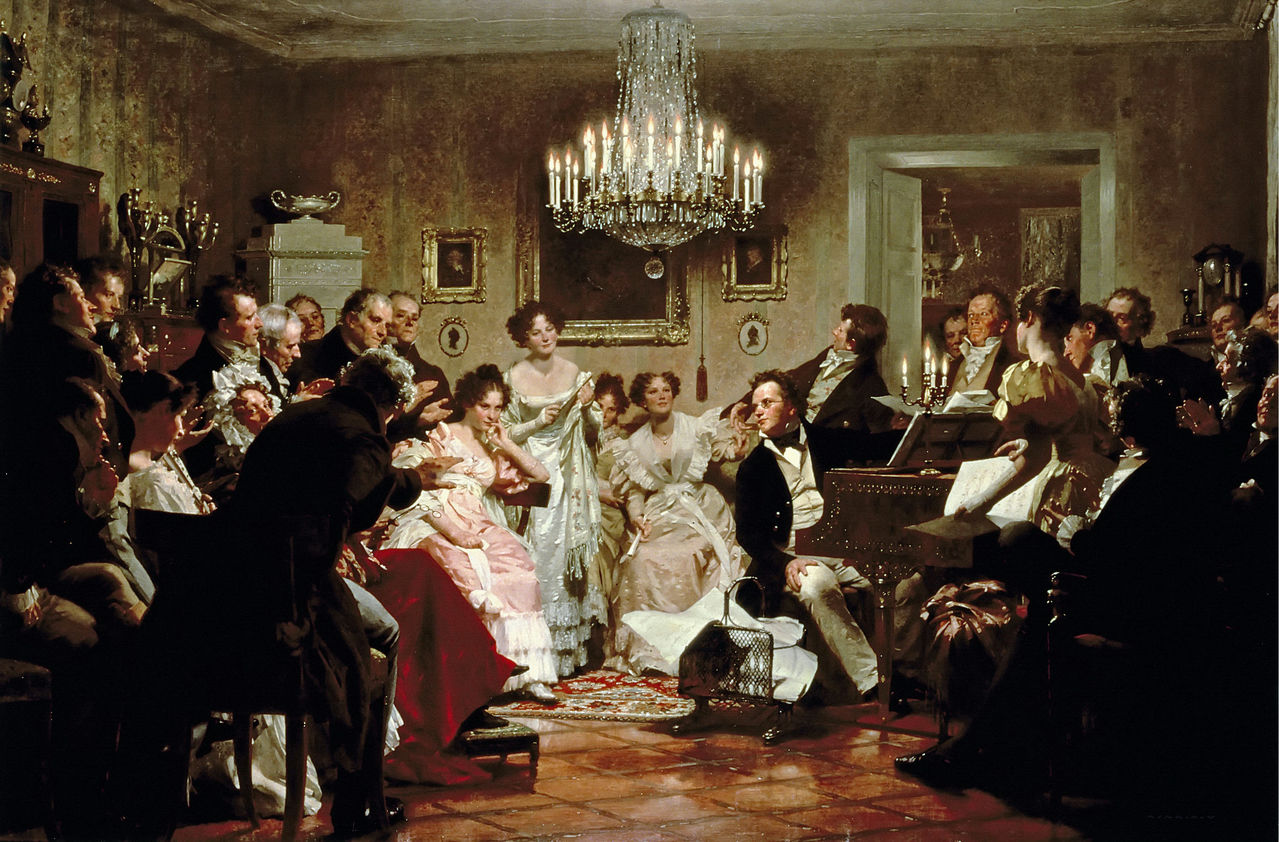
Julius Schmid's 1897 Schubertiade

There are two famous depictions of Schubertiades. The first is an 1868 sepia drawing made "from memory" by Moritz von Schwind, which shows a relatively intimate scene. The drawing shows Schubert at the piano, with Johann Michael Vogl and a circle of friends surrounding them. The woman in the painting on the wall is Schubert's alleged, unrequited love, the Countess Karoline Esterházy.

In contrast, the 1897 depiction by Julius Schmid is a somewhat more formal affair, and the people in the painting are not recognizably Schubert's friends.

== Schubertiade today ==
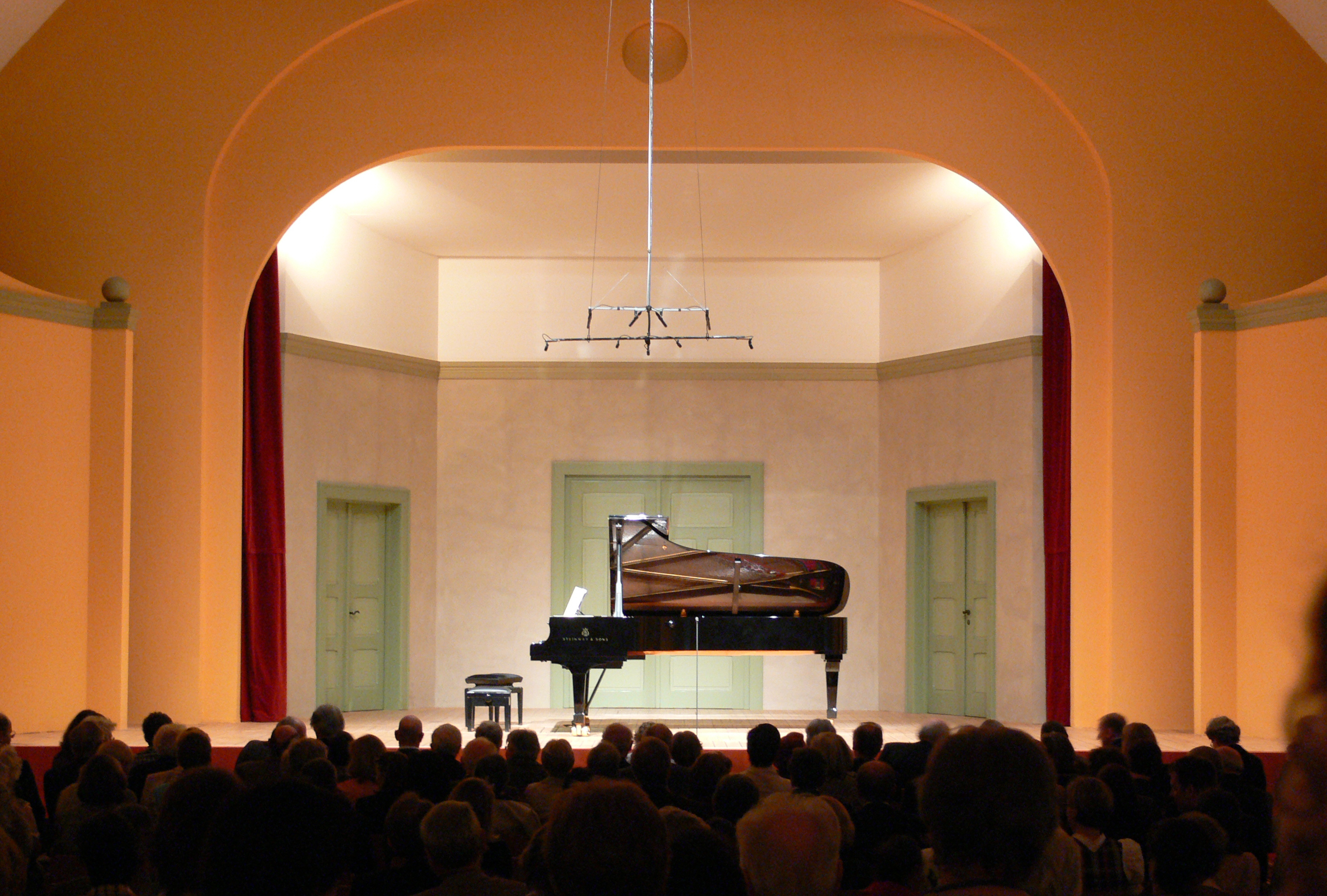
Markus Sittikus hall in Hohenems, the current main venue of the Schubertiade Vorarlberg

Since the 20th century, larger music festivals, which are mainly concerned with Schubert's work are called by the name "Schubertiade", including in particular the Schubertiade Vorarlberg founded by Hermann Prey and Gerd Nachbauer in 1976 which is held regularly in Hohenems and Schwarzenberg in the Austrian province of Vorarlberg.

The Schubertiade in Schwarzenberg and Hohenems is one of the biggest Schubert festivals with around 80 events and between 35,000 and 40,000 visitors each year. Chamber concerts, piano recitals as well as orchestral concerts, readings and lectures, as well as master classes by renowned artists are part of the event.

== Notes ==
=== Sources ===
- Gibbs, Christopher H. (2000). The Life of Schubert. Cambridge, UK: Cambridge University Press. ISBN 0-521-59512-6 – via Internet Archive.
