= Sonnleithner =

Sonnleithner is a surname. Notable people with the surname include:

- A family of lawyers from Vienna which is closely connected to the world of theater and music. Three of its members are of particular interest to biographers.
  - Christoph Sonnleithner (1734–1786), Austrian jurist and composer.
  - Joseph Sonnleithner (1766–1835), Austrian librettist, theater director, lawyer and archivist.
  - Ignaz von Sonnleithner (1770–1831), Austrian jurist, writer and educator.
  - Leopold von Sonnleithner (1797–1873), Austrian lawyer and composer.
  - Franz von Sonnleithner (1905–1981), Austrian lawyer and diplomat.
