= Wilhelm August Rieder =

Austrian painter and draughtsman

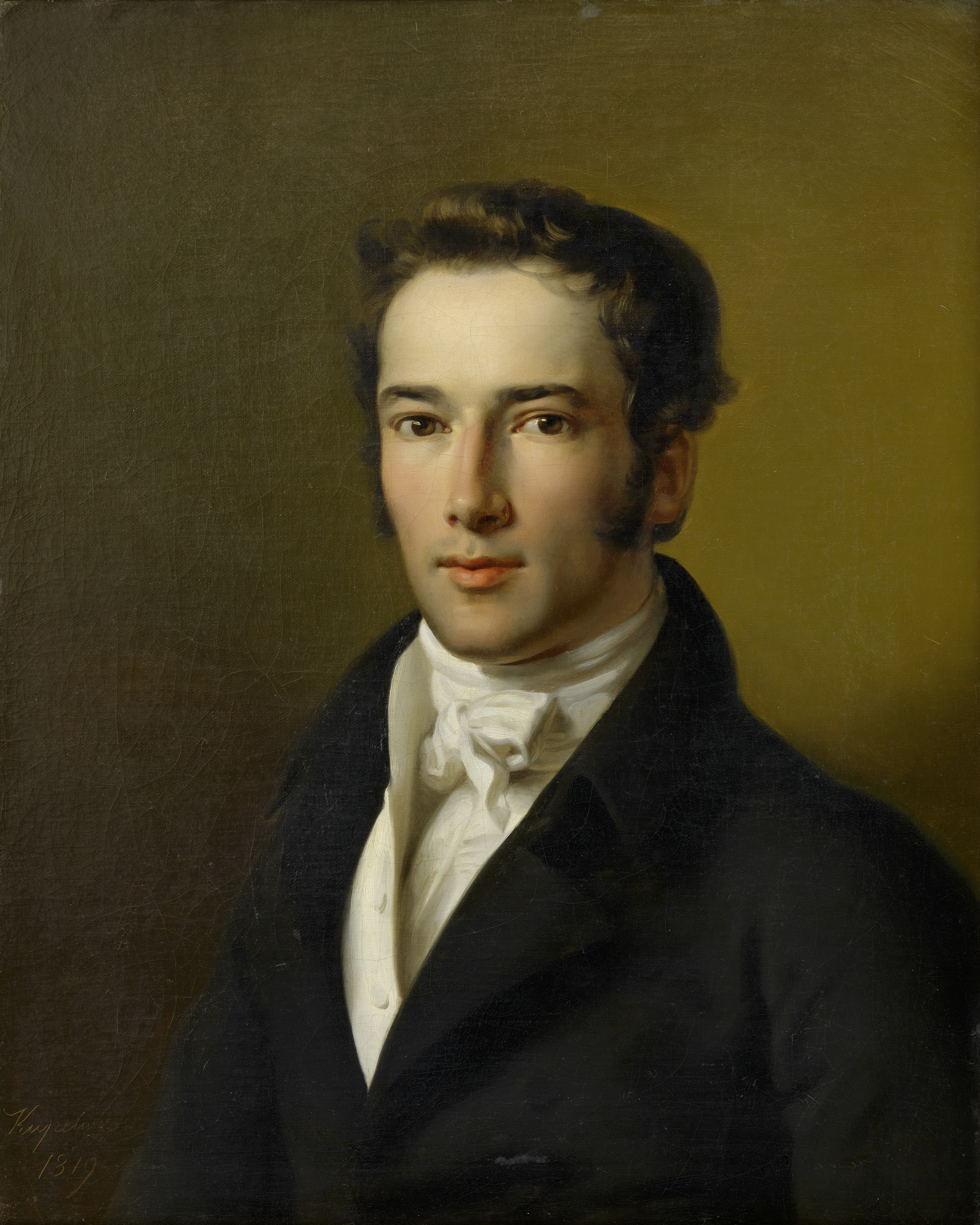
Portrait possibly depicting Rieder by Leopold Kupelwieser, 1819

Wilhelm August Rieder (October 30, 1796 – September 8, 1880) was an Austrian painter and draftsman.

Rieder was born in Oberdöbling, the son of the composer Ambros Rieder (1771–1855). He studied at the Academy of Fine Arts Vienna, where he first met and befriended Franz Schubert. Schubert's brother Ferdinand Schubert described Rieder's brother Johann as "my only true friend" in a letter to Schubert on July 3, 1824. Rieder's watercolor of Schubert from 1825 was supposedly started when Rieder sheltered from a rainstorm in Schubert's lodgings at the Fruhwirth-Haus (Technikerstrasse 9). Schubert's friends thought it was a very good likeness: Leopold von Sonnleithner called it "the most like him", whilst Josef von Spaun called it "an extraordinarily good likeness".

He subsequently painted a number of Schubert's portraits. Rieder also painted a number of religious and historical themed works. He became professor of drawing at the Institute of Engineering in Vienna in 1825, and in 1855 was appointed to a similar post at the Military Academy at Wiener Neustadt. From 1857 he was assistant curator of paintings at the Belvedere palace.

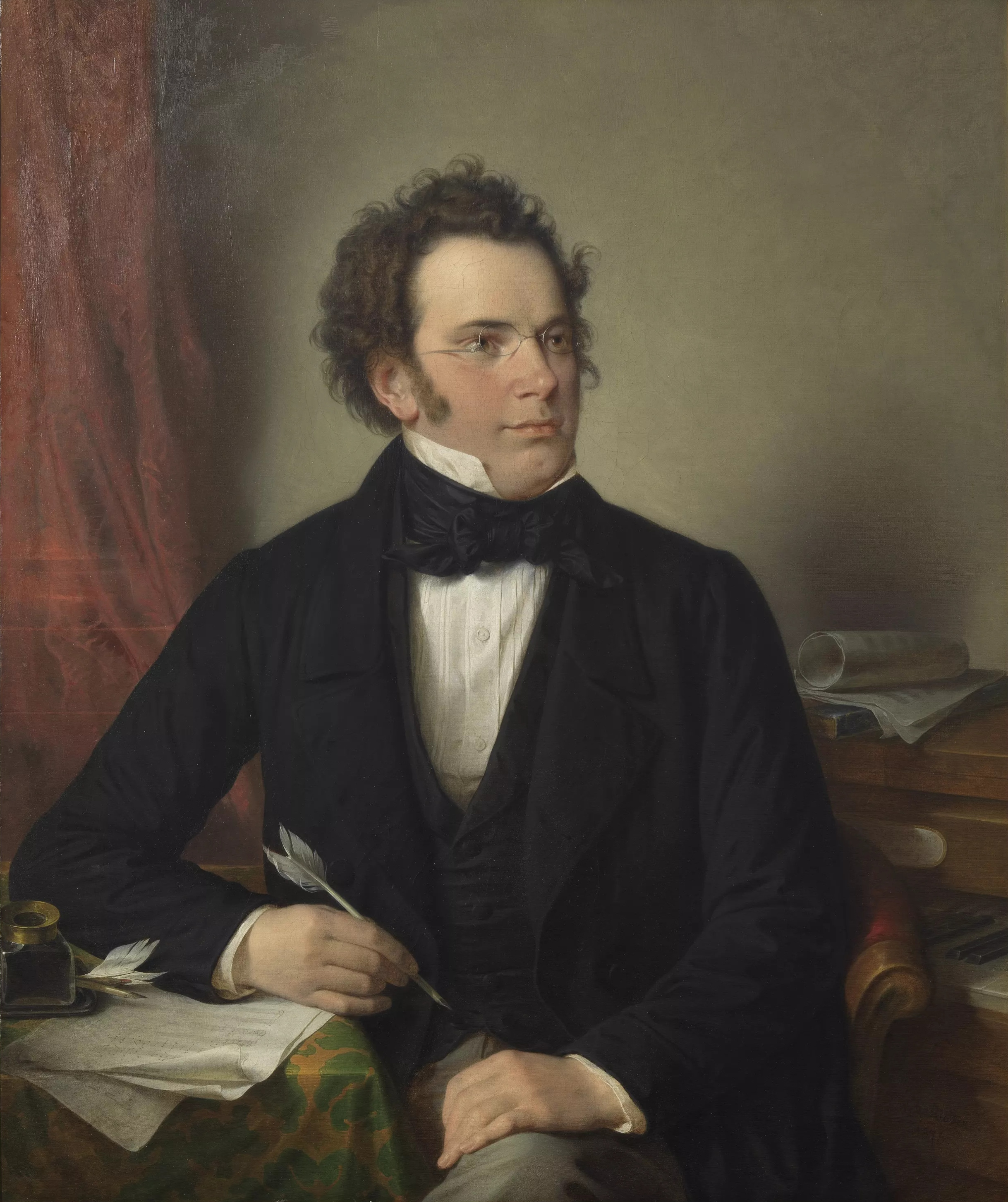
Oil portrait painting of Franz Schubert by Wilhelm August Rieder, after his own 1825 watercolor portrait, Vienna Museum, 1875
