= Franz von Sonnleithner =

Austrian-born official in Nazi Germany (1905–1981)

Franz Edler von Sonnleithner (June 1, 1905 – April 18, 1981) was a diplomat who acted as Ribbentrop's representative in Adolf Hitler's headquarters during the later years of the war with the rank of minister.

== Life ==
Sonnleithner was born in Salzburg, Austria and studied law in Vienna and Innsbruck, where he gained a doctorate in 1928. He was then a police commissioner in Vienna and Salzburg and worked in the Federal Chancellery in Vienna. In October 1934, Sonnleithner was removed from office due to his advocacy for the unification of Germany and Austria, as well as his involvement in the Nazi Party, which had been banned. Sonnleithner was arrested for involvement in the Nazi Party in 1936, and sentenced to six years in prison for high treason. He remained in prison until February 12, 1938, when he was released due to the upcoming Anschluss. After joining the Reich Foreign Office, Sonnleithner worked on the personal staff of the Foreign Minister Joachim von Ribbentrop.

Sonnleithner was present at the situation conference in 1944 at the Wolf's Lair headquarters in Rastenburg, East Prussia when the 20 July plot bomb was planted by Claus Von Stauffenberg. From April 1945 to 1948, he was held in American internment camps. Sonnleithner then worked in industry in Ingelheim am Rhein where he died aged 75.

== See also ==
- Sonnleithner

== Bibliography ==
- Sonnleithner, Franz von (1989), Als Diplomat im Fuhrerhauptquartier: Aus dem Nachlass, Langen Müller, Munich, ISBN 3-7844-2267-5
