= Faniska =

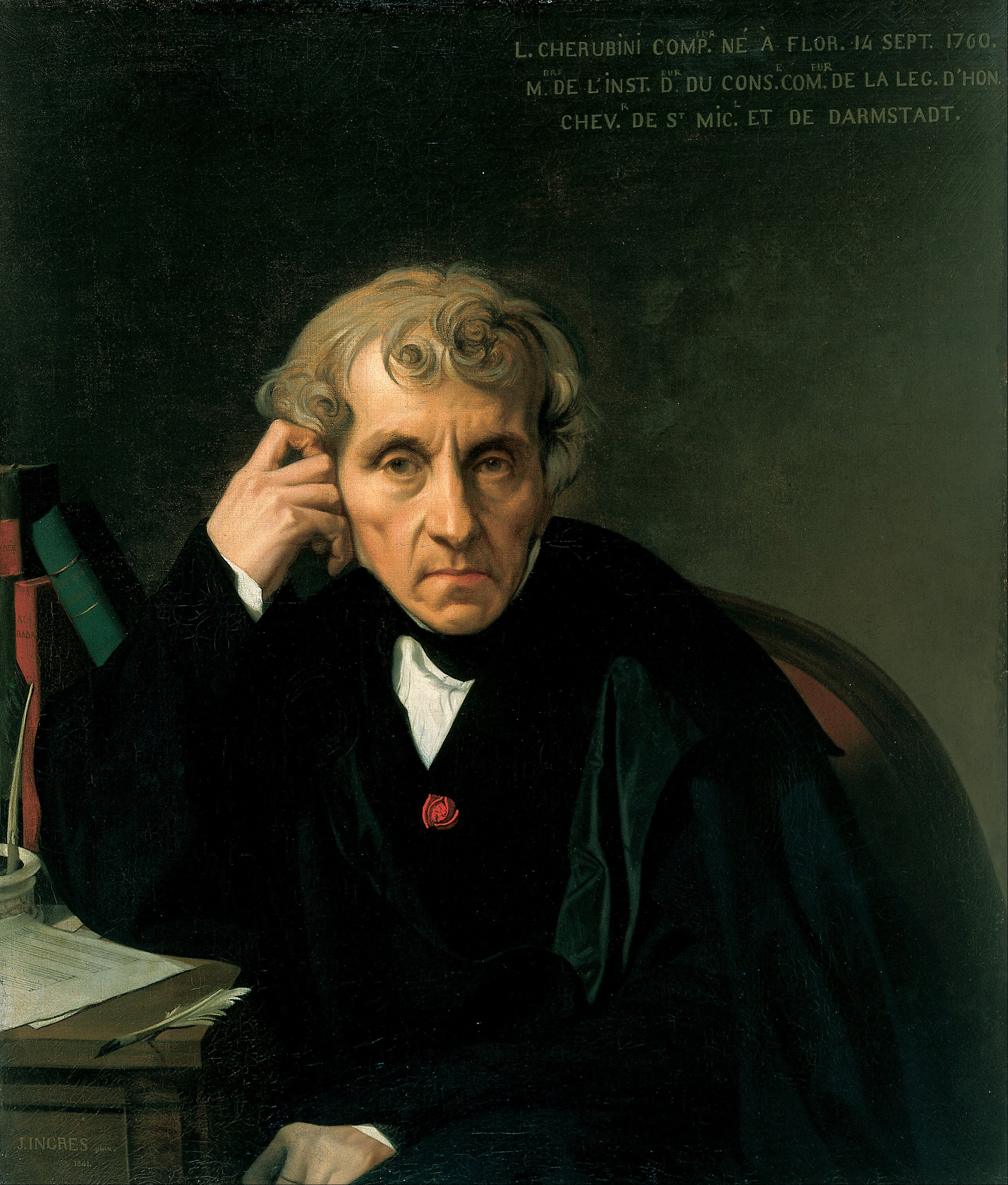
Luigi Cherubini

Faniska is an opera eroica in three acts by Luigi Cherubini. The German libretto, by Joseph Sonnleithner, is based on the melodrama Les mines de Pologne (1803) by René-Charles Guilbert de Pixérécourt.

== Background ==
In June 1805, Cherubini took up an invitation to travel to Vienna, where his works were highly appreciated. Here he put on a series of concerts and attended a performance of Beethoven's Fidelio. He met Haydn, a composer he particularly admired, and gave him a medal from the Conservatoire de Paris. Haydn presented Cherubini with the manuscript of his "Drumroll Symphony". Cherubini also accepted a commission to write an opera for the Viennese stage and Faniska was the result. The plot has much in common with Cherubini's earlier rescue opera Lodoïska (1791), including its Polish setting.

== Performance history ==
The opera was first performed at the Theater am Kärntnertor, Vienna, on 25 February 1806. It was enthusiastically received by Beethoven and Haydn but failed to win a lasting place in the repertoire.

== Roles ==
Roles, voice types, premiere cast
Role	Voice type	Premiere cast, 25 February 1806
Rasinski, mayor of Rava	tenor	
Faniska, his wife	soprano	Anna Milder
Hedwig, his daughter	soprano	Thérèse Neumann
Zamoski, mayor of Sandomir	bass	Karl Friedrich Clemens Weinmüller
Oranski, captain of the Cossacks in Zamoski's service	bass	Johann Vogel
Moska, Zamoski's maid	soprano	
Rasno, her nephew	tenor	Wilhelm Ehlers
Manoski, a friend of Rasinski	tenor	
Two Cossack officials	tenor and bass	
Chorus: Cossacks, guards, servants, countrymen and women

== Synopsis ==
Act 1
Zamoski, the starosta of Sandomir, orders his Cossack henchman Oranski to kidnap Faniska, the wife of the starosta of Rava, Rasinski. Faniska is taken to Zamoski's castle but manages to resist his advances. Rasinski arrives at the castle disguised as a messenger. Zamoski sees through his disguise and throws Rasinski and Faniska into the castle dungeon.

Act 2
Zamoski's maid Moska and Moska's nephew Rasno try to free the couple from prison but their plan fails.

Act 3
The couple finally manage to escape with Rasno's help. Rasinski's soldiers attack the castle, Zamoski is killed and Oranski is captured and brought to trial.

== Recordings ==
- Faniska (Italian version) Natalia Rubis, Krystian Adam, Katarzyna Belkius, Robert Gierlach, Poznan Chamber Choir, Poznan Philharmonic Orchestra, Lukasz Borowicz, 2 CDs Label: DUX, DDD, 2020
