= Schubertiade Vorarlberg =

Music festival in Vorarlberg, Austria

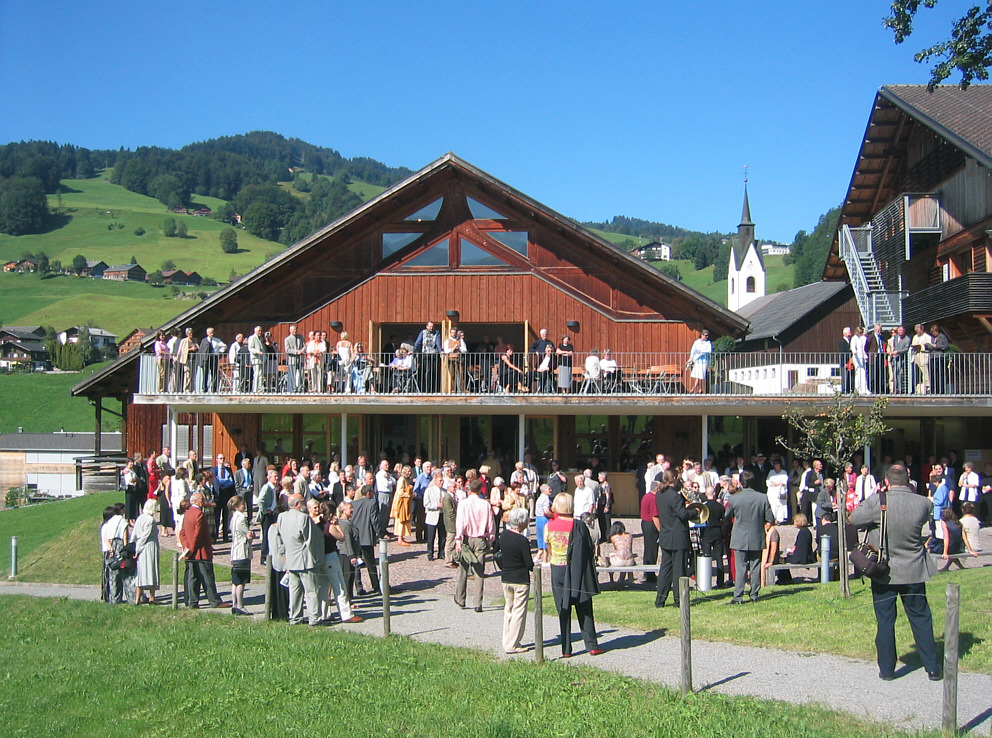
- The Schubertiade Vorarlberg at the Angelika Kauffmann hall in Schwarzenberg in 2004
- Genre: classical music
- Locations: Schwarzenberg, Hohenems (Vorarlberg, Austria)
- Years active: 1976 – present
- Attendance: 35,000 visitors per year
- Organiser: Schubertiade GmbH
- Website: https://www.montafon.at/montafoner-resonanzen/de

The Schubertiade Vorarlberg is a music festival in Vorarlberg (Austria). A Schubertiade is an event dedicated to the life and works of the Austrian composer Franz Schubert. The Schubertiade Vorarlberg is one the most known Schubertiades in the world.

== History ==
In the decade of 1820, the first Schubertiades were held as private house concerts. Franz Schubert played the piano at the first Schubertiads, and the baritones Johann Michael Vogl or later Carl von Schönstein sang his songs. Readings and witty entertainment games, which often had a specific theme, were also part of the evenings. These were a mixture of friendly meetings and a literary-musical salon.

The first Vorarlberg Schubertiade took place in Hohenems in 1976 and was organised by Hermann Prey. In the first few years, Gerd Nachbauer and Hermann Prey were responsible for the programme.

=== Today ===
Nowadays, the Schubertiade is held at venues in Schwarzenberg and Hohenems, both in the Austrian state of Vorarlberg. The concerts are usually held between May and October.

The Schubertiade is considered the most important Schubert festival in the world, presenting about 80 events and registering between 35,000 and 40,000 visitors per year.

The festival features orchestra concerts, lectures, exhibitions and master classes given by singers and instrumentalists. It aims at advancing the careers of young musicians by introducing them to a knowledgeable and supportive audience.

== Venue ==
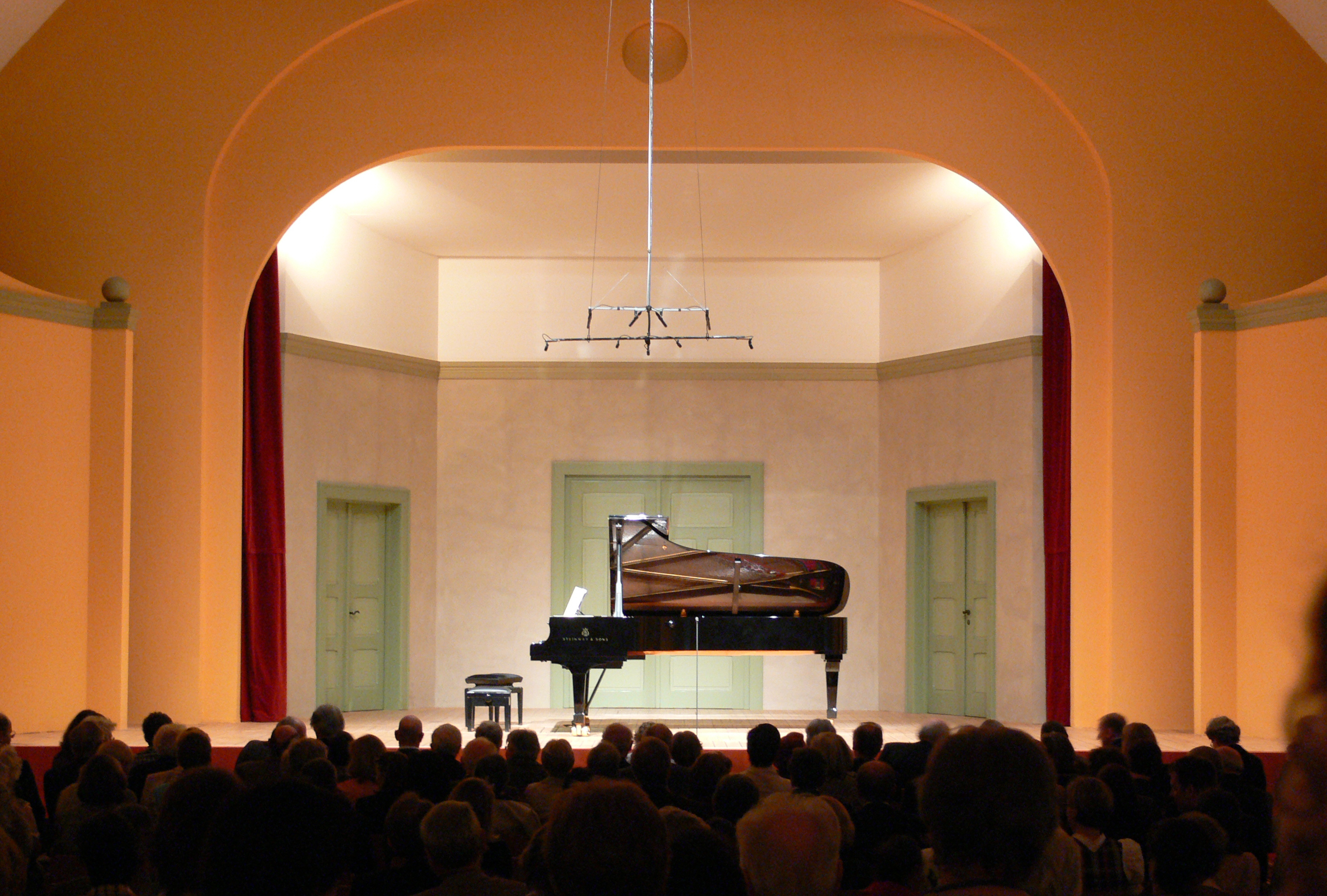
The Markus Sittikus hall in Hohenems, a former gymnasium

So far, the Schubertiade Vorarlberg has been held at various venues in the federal state of Vorarlberg and around Lake Constance.

From its beginning in 1976 to 1991, the Hohenems Palace used to be the main location for the Vorarlberg version of the Schubertiade. The Hohenems Palace is known for being the finding place of two manuscripts of the Nibelungenlied.

When the Hohenems Palace had to be renovated in 1991, the festival moved entirely to the neighbouring town of Feldkirch. From 1994 on, the Feldkirch concerts were complemented by so-called Landpartien, outings inspired by Franz Schubert's travels. The venues for the Landpartien included the Propstei St. Gerold (a provost's residence in the Walsertal), Achberg Castle, Lindau Island (Germany), and Schwarzenberg.

Due to the renovation of the Angelika Kauffmann hall, Schwarzenberg became the exclusive venue of the Schubertiade Vorarlberg in 2001. In 2005, the festival returned to Hohenems (Markus Sittikus hall), with some concerts still being held in Schwarzenberg.

=== The Schubertiade Quarter ===
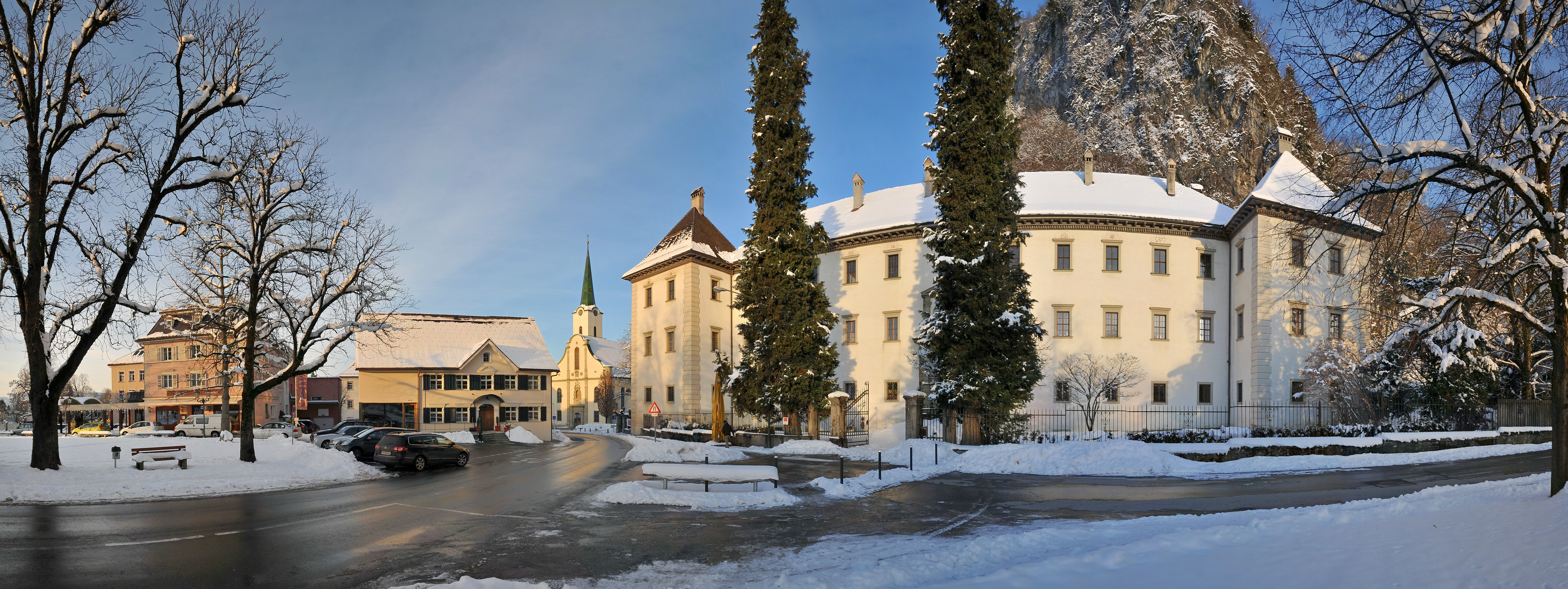
The Hohenems Palace in the wintertime

The Schubertiade Quarter in Hohenems consists of several museums that are thematically associated with Franz Schubert, interpreters of classical music and the cultural history of the city:

- Franz Schubert Museum
- Schubertiade Museum
- Elisabeth Schwarzkopf Museum
- Hohenems Palace
- the Heimann Rosenthal Villa (Jewish Museum Hohenems)
- Stefan Zweig Room in the Legge Museum
- Salomon Sulzer Gallery
- Markus Sittikus Hall (concert hall)
- Nibelungen Museum
- Schuhmacher Museum

== Gallery ==
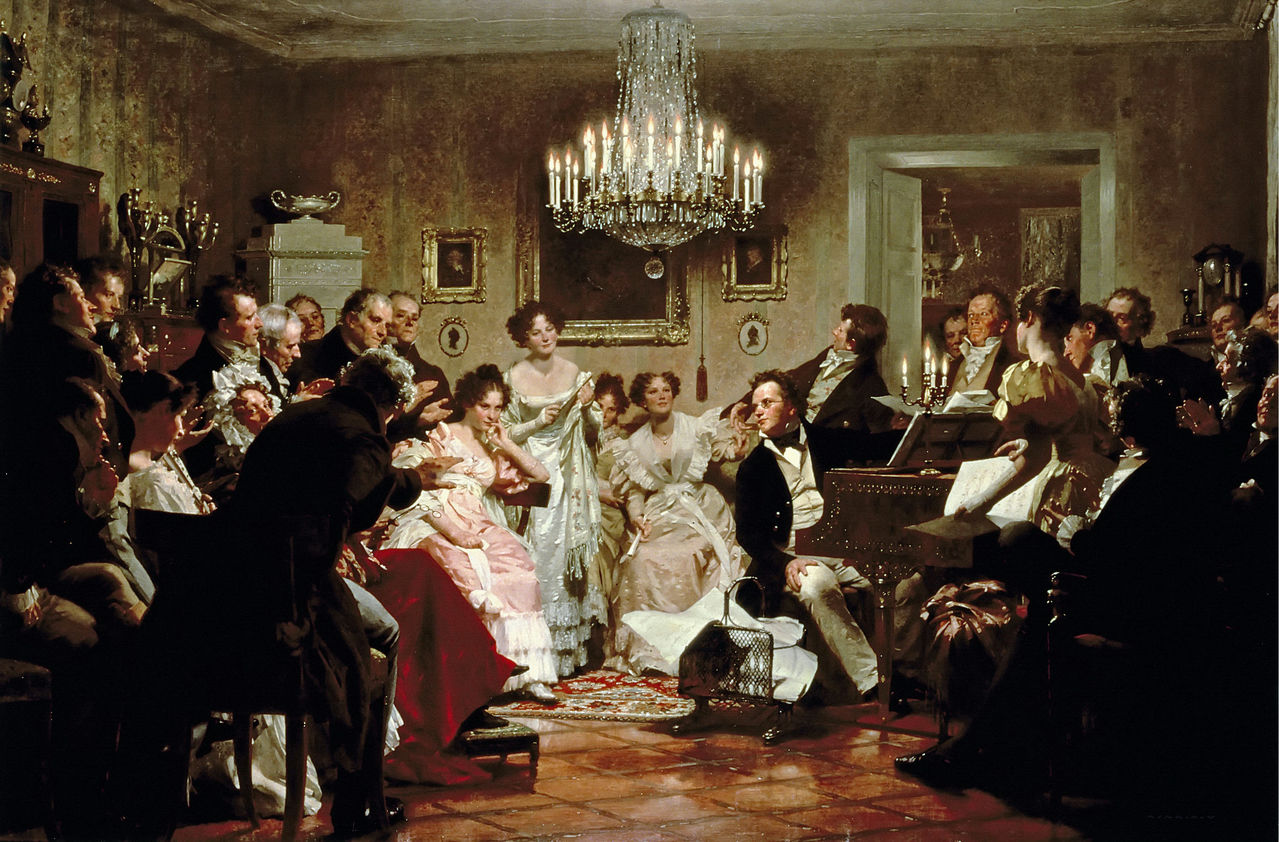
"Eine Schubertiade", oil painting by Julius Schmid (1897)

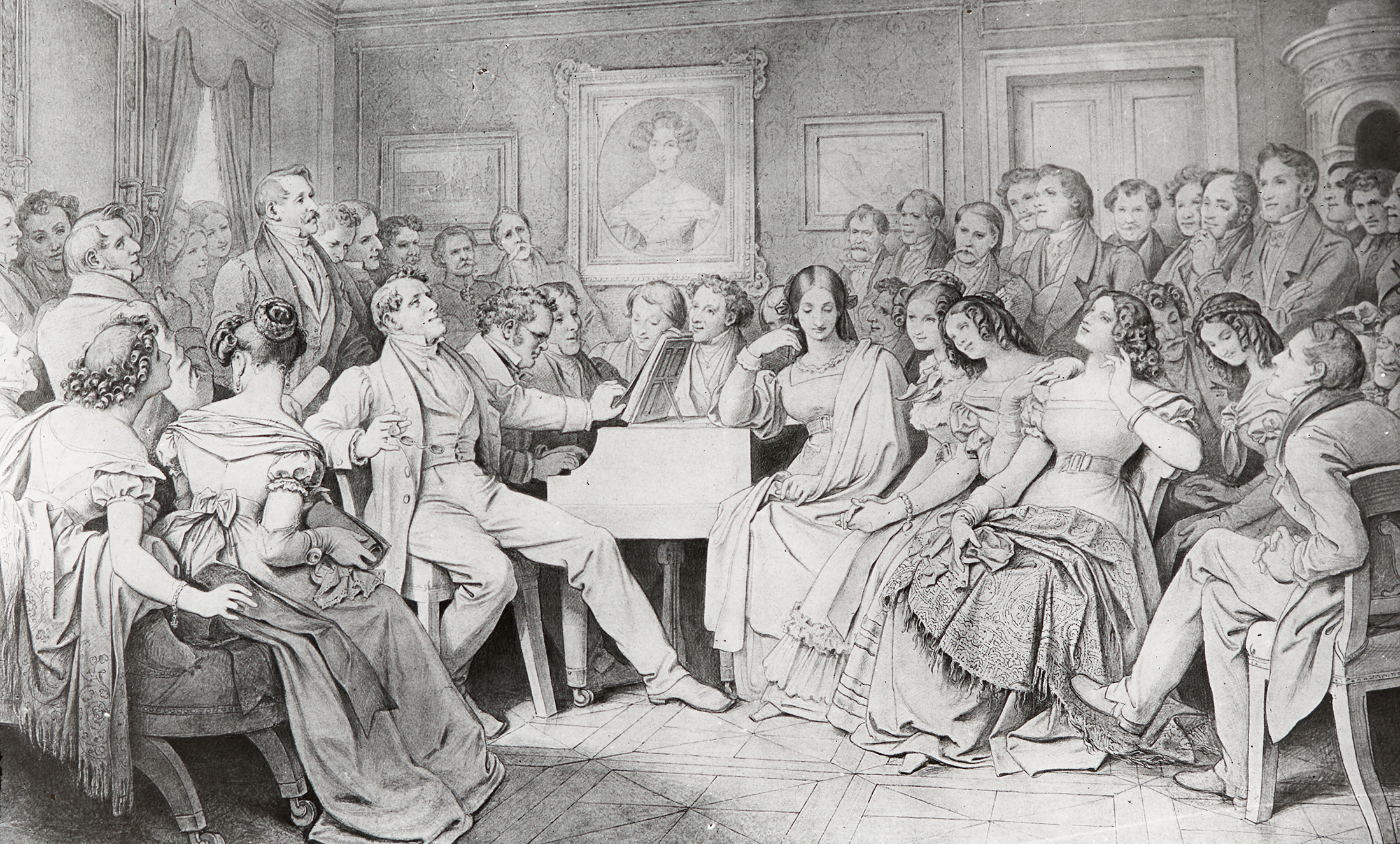
"Schubertiade", sepia drawing by Schubert's friend Moritz von Schwind (1868), drawn from memory

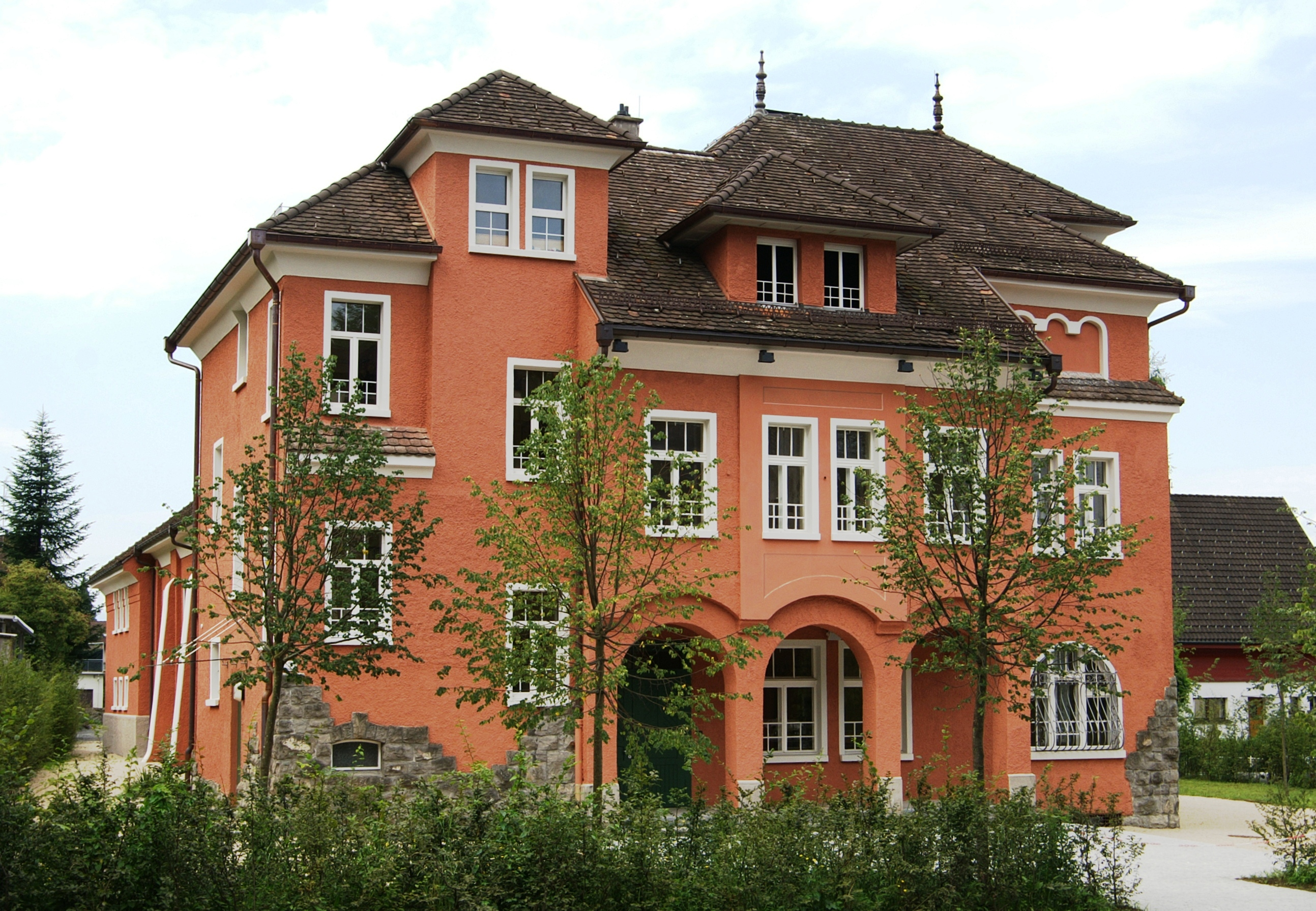
The building housing the Markus Sittikus hall in Hohenems, Vorarlberg
