= Angelika Kauffmann Museum =

Museum in Schwarzenberg, Austria

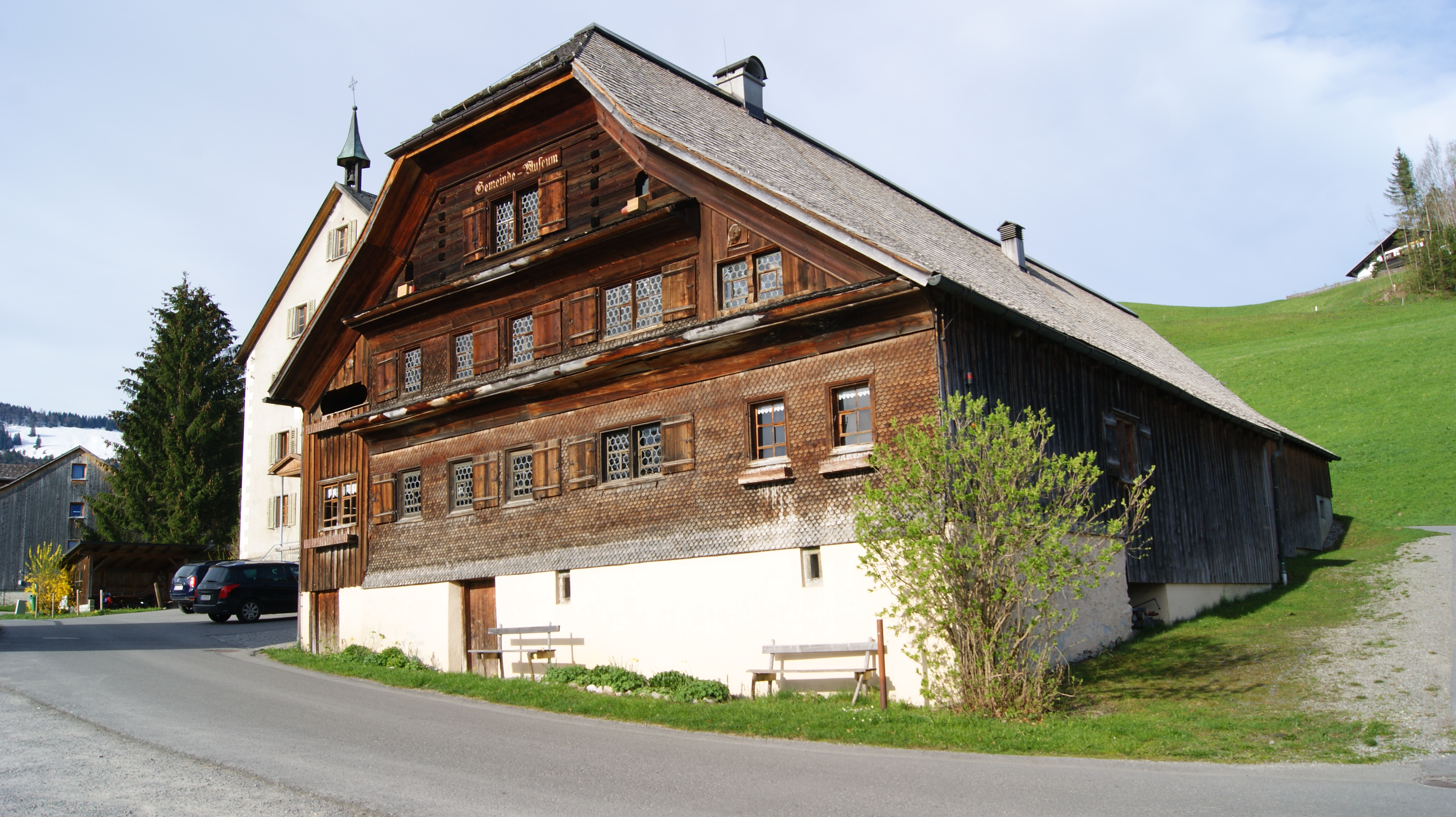
- The Kleberhaus
- Established: 2007
- Location: Schwarzenberg, Austria, Vorarlberg, Austria
- Coordinates: 47.4158°N 9.8511°E
- Type: Art, local history
- Curator: Bettina Baumgärtel
- Website: http://angelika-kauffmann.com/

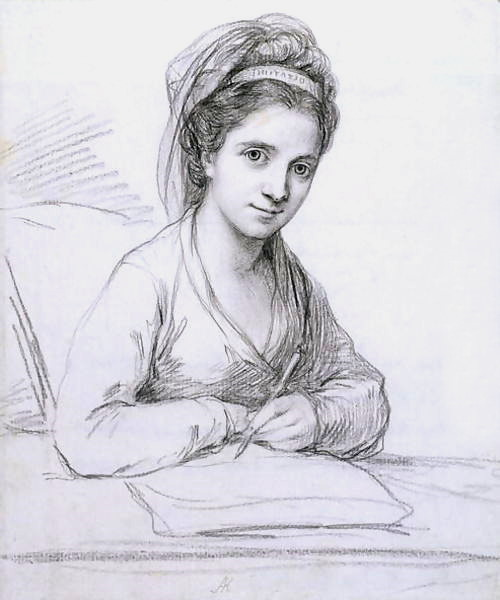
Angelica Kauffman (self-portrait, 1771)

The Angelika Kauffmann Museum is a museum in Schwarzenberg, Vorarlberg (Austria) dedicated to the life and works of the Swiss painter Angelica Kauffman.

Although born in Chur in Switzerland, Angelica Kauffman had close ties to her father's home village of Schwarzenberg. Together, they worked for the local bishop, creating apostle frescoes and the high altarpiece. Numerous letters and donations to the community indicate her life-long connection to Schwarzenberg, even after having moved to Italy.

== The building ==
The museum is housed in the "Kleberhaus", an old farmhouse in the traditional wooden style of the village, which dates back to 1556. The exhibition area is about 220 square meters large. The former agricultural wing of the house was specially adapted for the museum. The architect, Helmut Dietrich, carefully renovated the building by highlighting characteristic features like old tie beams and dark log walls but nonetheless giving it a clean, modern touch.

== Exhibitions ==
In the 2019 exhibition "Angelika Kauffmann – Unknown Treasures from Vorarlberg Private Collections", many of her paintings were shown to the public for the first time, as a large parts of her oeuvre are owned by private collectors.

- 2026: Erlesen. Angelika Kauffmann and literature
- 2025: Im Gewand. Angelika Kauffmann and fashion
- 2022: Eine von uns. Angelika Kauffmann, venerated and appropriated
- 2021: To Italy! Angelika Kauffmann and the Grand Tour
- 2019: Angelika Kauffmann – Unknown Treasures from Vorarlberg Private Collections
- 2018: Er ist wer. Men's portraits by Angelika Kauffmann
- 2017: Ich sehe mich. Women's portraits by Angelika Kauffmann
- 2016: Das bin ich. Children's portraits by Angelika Kauffmann
- 2015: Angelika Kauffmann. Residency Rome

== Local history museum ==
In addition to the Angelika Kauffmann Museum, the Kleberhaus has been housing the Schwarzenberg local history museum ("Heimatmuseum", founded in 1913) since 1928. It documents the domestic and farming culture of the 18th and early 19th centuries.

=== Exhibitions ===
- 2020/21: Who owns the "Bödele"? Understanding a cultural landscape
- 2019: How it used to be at home
- 2017/18: Heimarbeit. Wirtschaftswunder am Küchentisch
- 2015/16: hüslo – bopplo – spielo (exhibition about toys)

Photo gallery

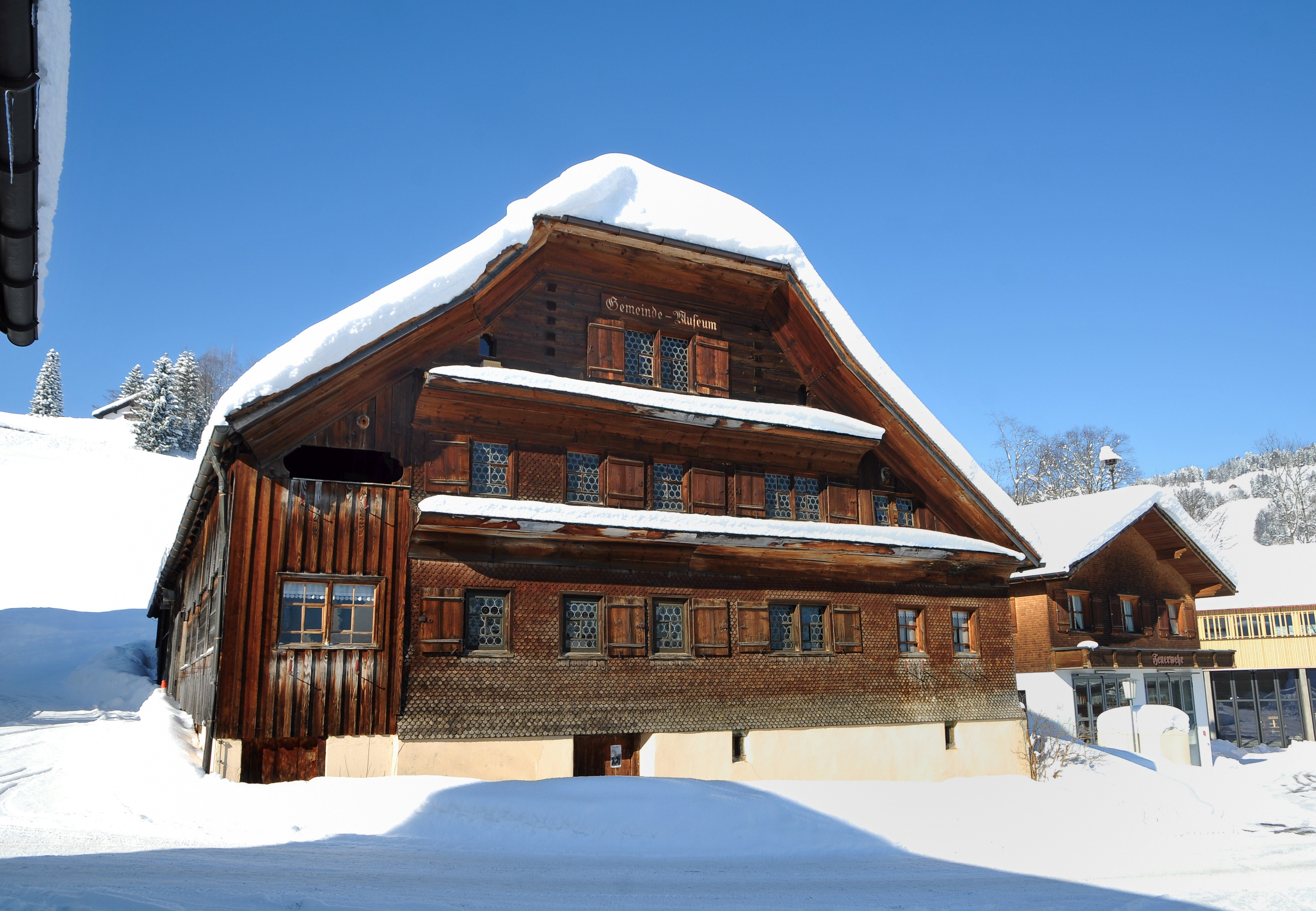
The Kleberhaus in winter

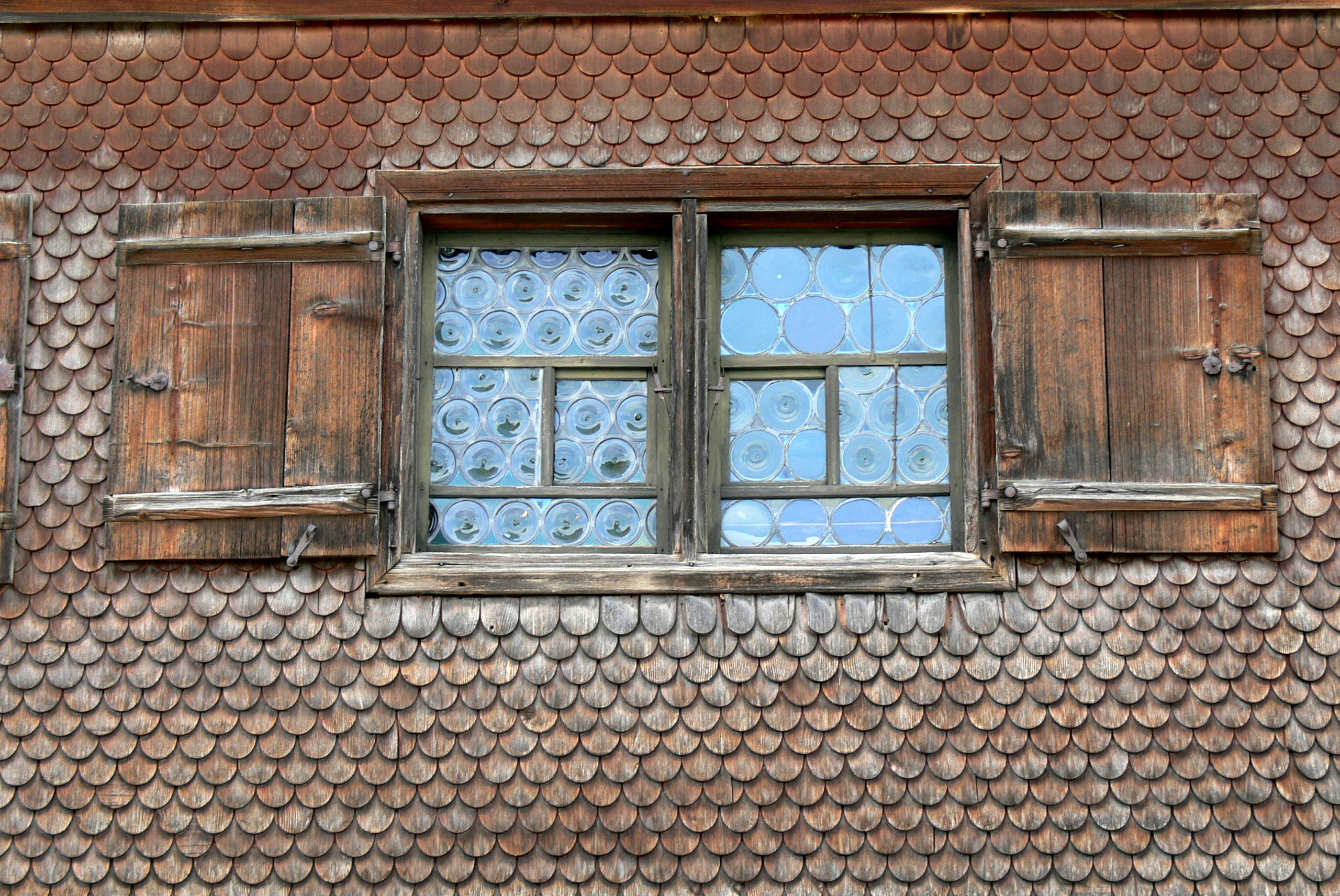
Detail of the building – window

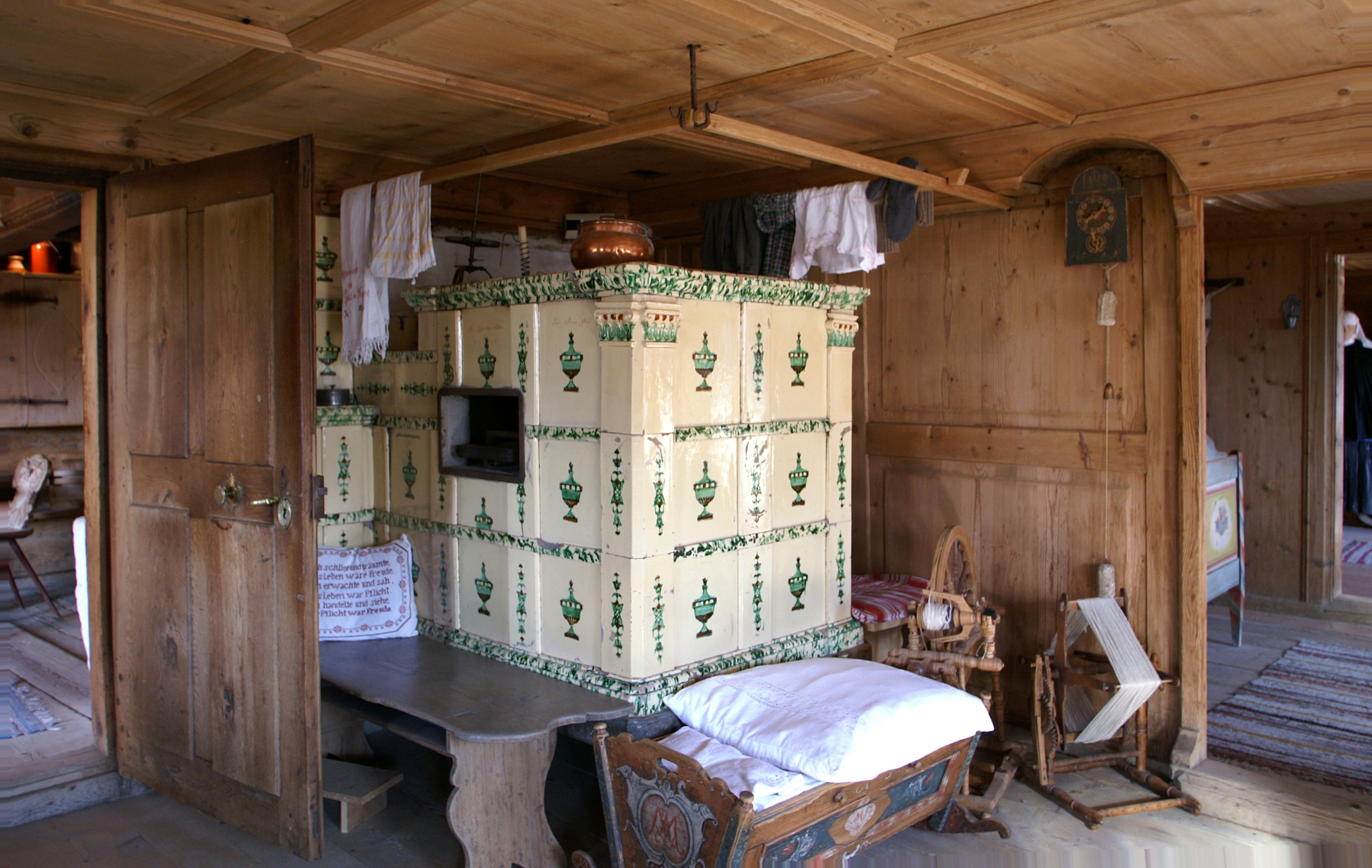
Living room

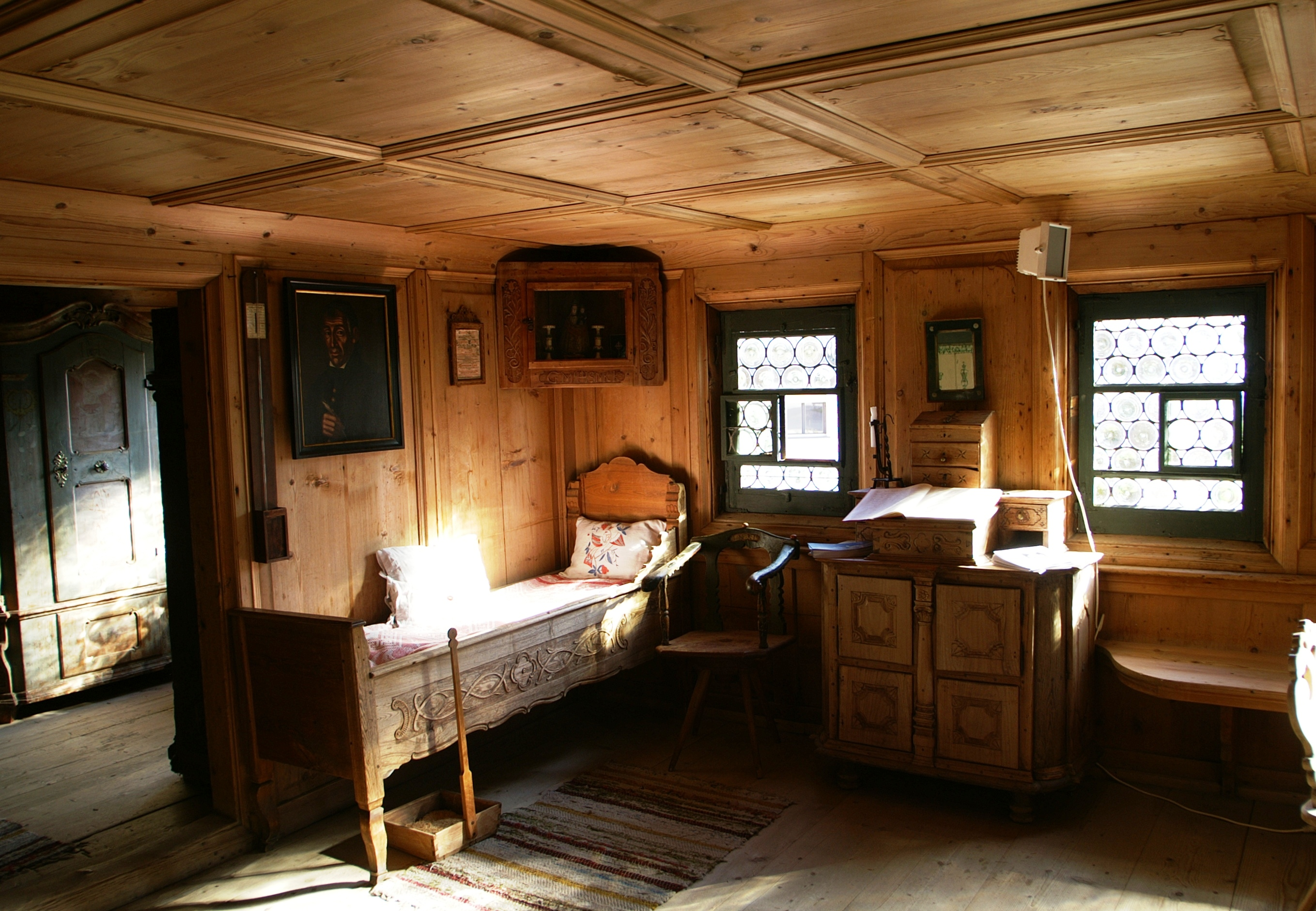
Bed room

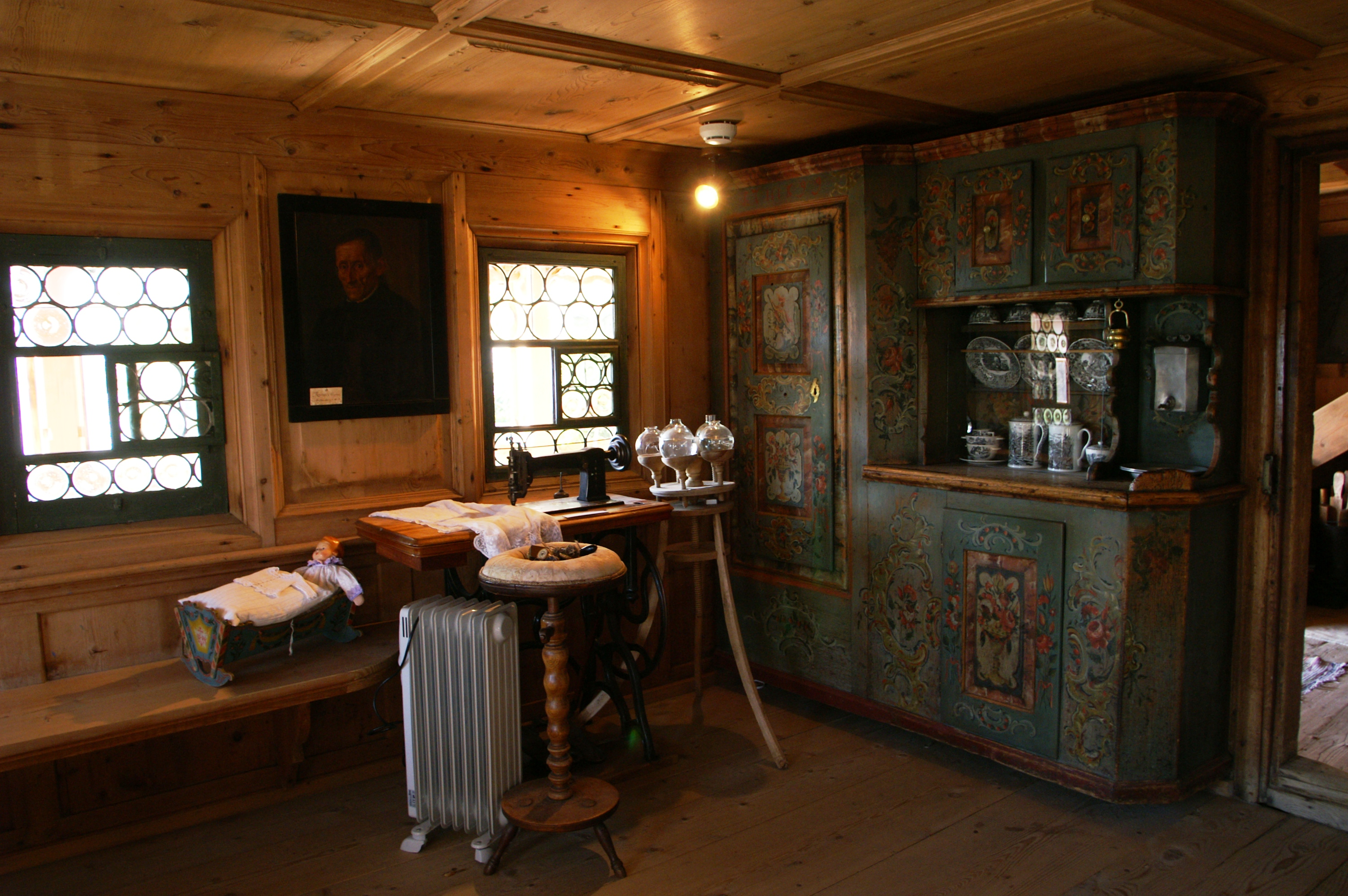

== See also ==
- List of museums devoted to one artist
