= Ignaz von Sonnleithner =

Austrian jurist, writer and educator (1770 - 1831)

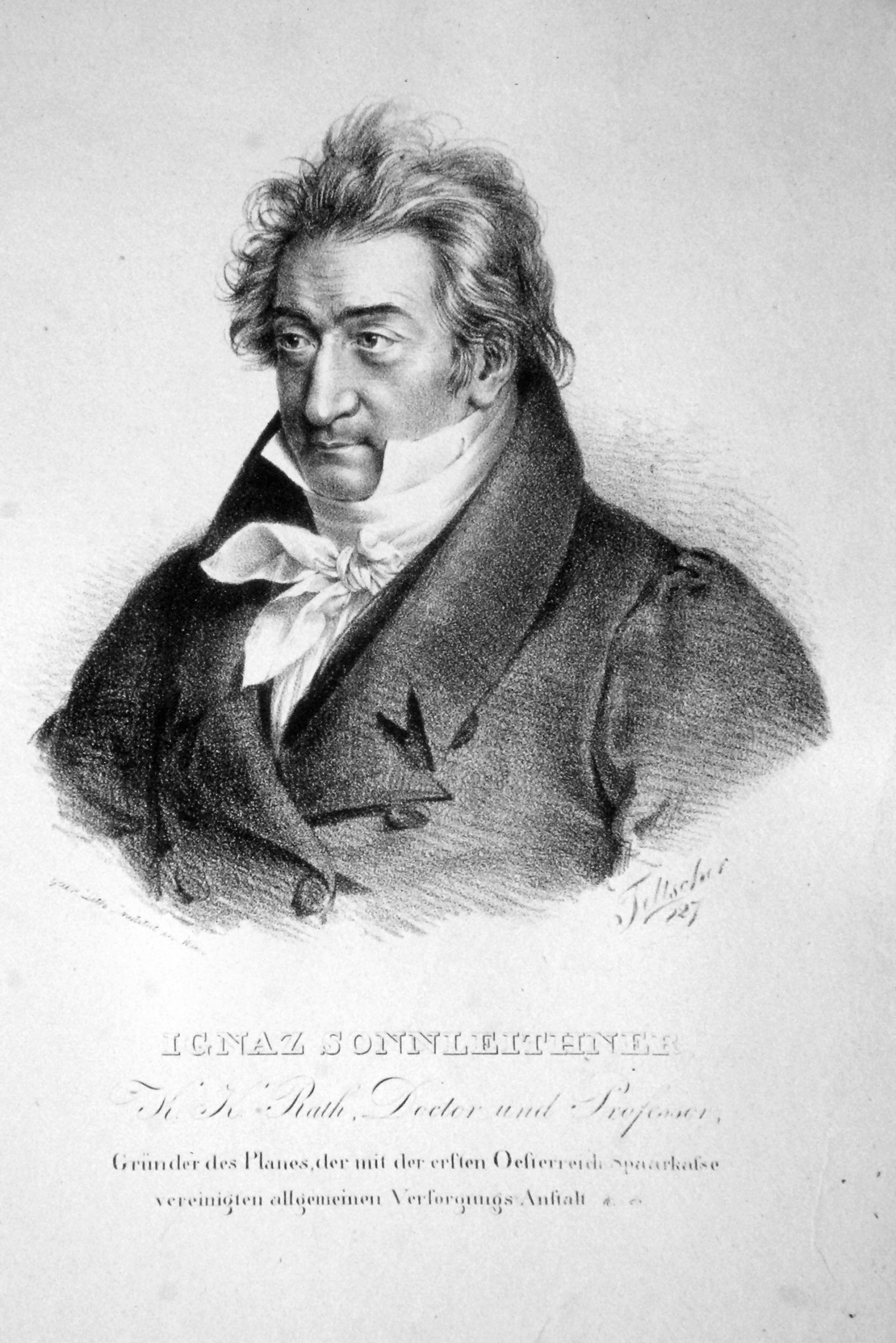
- Ignaz von Sonnleithner in an 1827 lithography by Austrian painter Josef Eduard Teltscher.
- Born: Ignaz Sonnleithner; Vienna
- Died: Vienna
- Other name: Ignaz Edler von Sonnleithner
- Occupations: Solicitor, jurist, writer
- Known for: Ludwig van Beethoven and Franz Schubert's friend

Ignaz Sonnleithner, from 1828 Ignaz Edler von Sonnleithner (30 July 1770 – 27 November 1831), was an Austrian jurist, writer and educator. He also founded the Society of Music Friends of the Austrian Imperial State in 1812. He was a close friend to Ludwig van Beethoven and Franz Schubert.

== Life ==
=== Family ===
Sonnleithner was born on 30 July 1770 in Vienna to Christoph Sonnleithner, a lawyer and composer of church music, symphonies and quartets, (Note: Sonnleithner composed excellent musical pieces, among them 36 quartets much admired by Austrian Emperor Joseph II, Holy Roman Emperor, who used to call him his favorite composer, and a few symphonies played by his friend Franz Bernhard Ritter von Kees and his orchestra.) and Anna Maria Franziska Sonnleithner Doppler, née Dobler (1739–1810). His brother was Joseph Sonnleithner and his sister Maria Anna Sonnleithner (1767–1819), married to Dr. Wenzel Grillparzer (1760–1809) from 12 January 1789, was the mother of Franz Grillparzer. He was married to Anna Putz (1773–1824) and one of his sons was Leopold von Sonnleithner.

=== Career ===
Sonnleithner was an Imperial Council, a solicitor from 1795, a civil law notary since 1803 and in 1801 professor of Trade and Exchange law at the University of Vienna. He also was a writer and founder of the General Pension Institution. He was in Vienna on 20 April 1828 with a nobility diploma dated 14 June 1828 stating that he was raised by the Austrian nobility.

Sonnleithner led from 1815 to 1824 a musical salon, where many songs were premiered by Franz Schubert. His witty sayings were legendary and circulated long after his death in Vienna. Eduard von Bauernfeld writes in his memoirs: "Grillparzer's uncle from maternal side was a famous Viennese wit." He died on 27 November 1831 and was buried in the Matzleinsdorfer cemetery at Wiener Gemeindebezirk 5 (Stadtbezirk). In 1890, the Sonnleithnergasse in Vienna-Favoriten was named after him.

== Additional informations ==
=== References ===
Attribution

- This article is based on the translation of the corresponding article on the German Wikipedia. A list of contributors can be found there at the History section.

=== Sources ===
- Eusebius Mandyczewski (2010). "Sonnleithner". Neue Deutsche Biographie (in German). Vol. 24. Berlin: Duncker & Humblot. pp. 581–582. (full text online).
- A. Brandtner: "Sonnleithner Ignaz von". In: Österreichisches Biographisches Lexikon 1815–1950 (ÖBL). Vol. 12, Austrian Academy of Sciences, Vienna 2005, ISBN 3-7001-3580-7, p. 425 f. (Direct links to "p. 425", "p. 426")
- Genealogical Handbook of nobility, Adelslexikon Vol. III, Vol. 128 the whole series, C. A. Starke publishing, Limburg (Lahn) 2002, ISSN 0435-2408
- Peter Leisching: Die Sonnleithners. In: Magazine Adler. 1995, p. 65f

== Bibliography ==
- Trial of a guideline on the Austrian legal action and exchange, Anton Gassler publishing, Vienna 1801
- Vienna thoughts on banknotes, bonds and public funds. To reassure his fellow citizens. Andreas Gassler publishing, Vienna 1810
- Textbook of commercial science for the use of the students of the Imperial Polytechnic Institute in Vienna, Carl Gerold publishing, Vienna 1819
- Textbook on the Austrian trade and exchange law, combined with legal provisions on the common law relationships of the merchants, Vienna 1820 (1st ed.), 1832 (2nd ed.)
