= Schwarzenberg, Austria =

Schwarzenberg
- Municipality
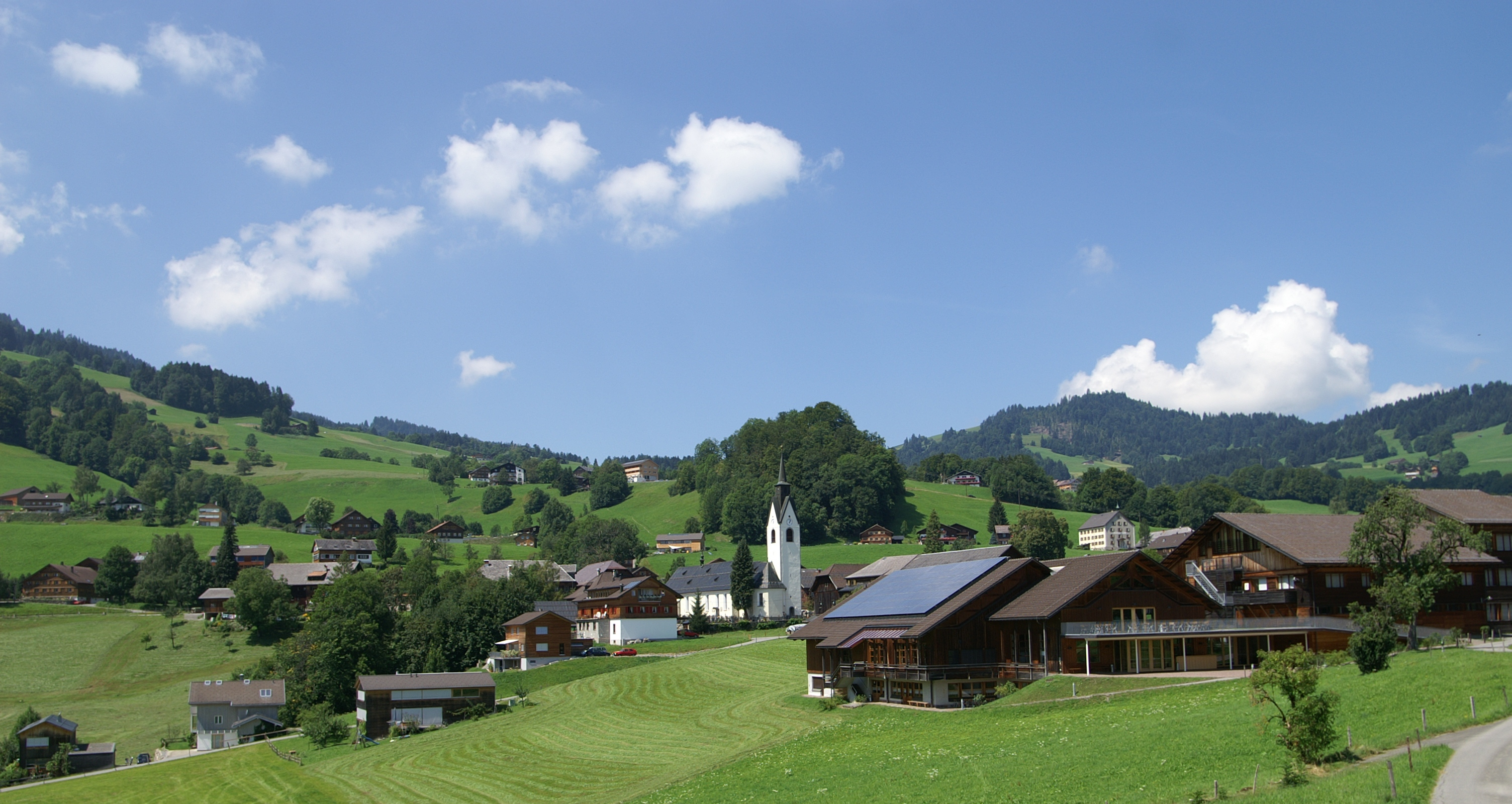

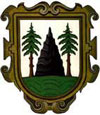
- Coat of arms

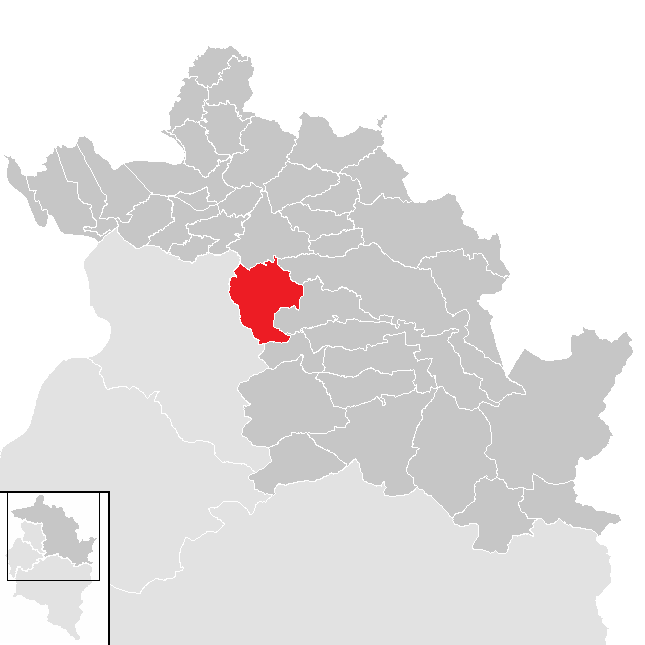
- Location in the district

- Location within Austria
- Coordinates: 47°25′00″N 09°51′00″E
- Country: Austria
- State: Vorarlberg
- District: Bregenz

Government
  - Mayor: Armin Berchtold

Area
  - Total: 25.76 km^{2} (9.95 sq mi)
- Elevation: 696 m (2,283 ft)

Population (2018-01-01)
  - Total: 1,850
  - Density: 71.8/km^{2} (186/sq mi)
- Time zone: UTC+1 (CET)
  - Summer (DST): UTC+2 (CEST)
- Postal code: 6867
- Area code: 05512
- Vehicle registration: B
- Website: www.schwarzenberg.at

Schwarzenberg (German pronunciation: [ˈʃvaʁtsn̩ˌbɛʁk]) is a municipality in the Bregenz Forest in the western Austrian state of Vorarlberg, part of the district of Bregenz. Schwarzenberg has an area of 25.76 km². It lies south of Lake Constance. The village center is heritage-protected for its traditional rustic wooden houses.

== Population ==
Historical population
Year	Pop.	±%
1869	1,300	—
1880	1,105	−15.0%
1890	1,214	+9.9%
1900	1,233	+1.6%
1910	1,209	−1.9%
1923	1,181	−2.3%
1934	1,258	+6.5%
1939	1,262	+0.3%
1951	1,333	+5.6%
1961	1,282	−3.8%
1971	1,430	+11.5%
1981	1,470	+2.8%
1991	1,576	+7.2%
2001	1,669	+5.9%
2011	1,805	+8.1%

According to the last count in September 2011, the municipality has 1810 inhabitants.

== Notable residents ==
- Angelica Kauffman (1741-1807), artist, grew up in Schwarzenberg.

== Culture ==
=== Points of interest ===
- The Angelika Kauffmann Museum displays oil paintings, porcelain, souvenirs and letters from Kauffmann's father. It also offers an overview of Bregenzerwälder life in the 18th century.

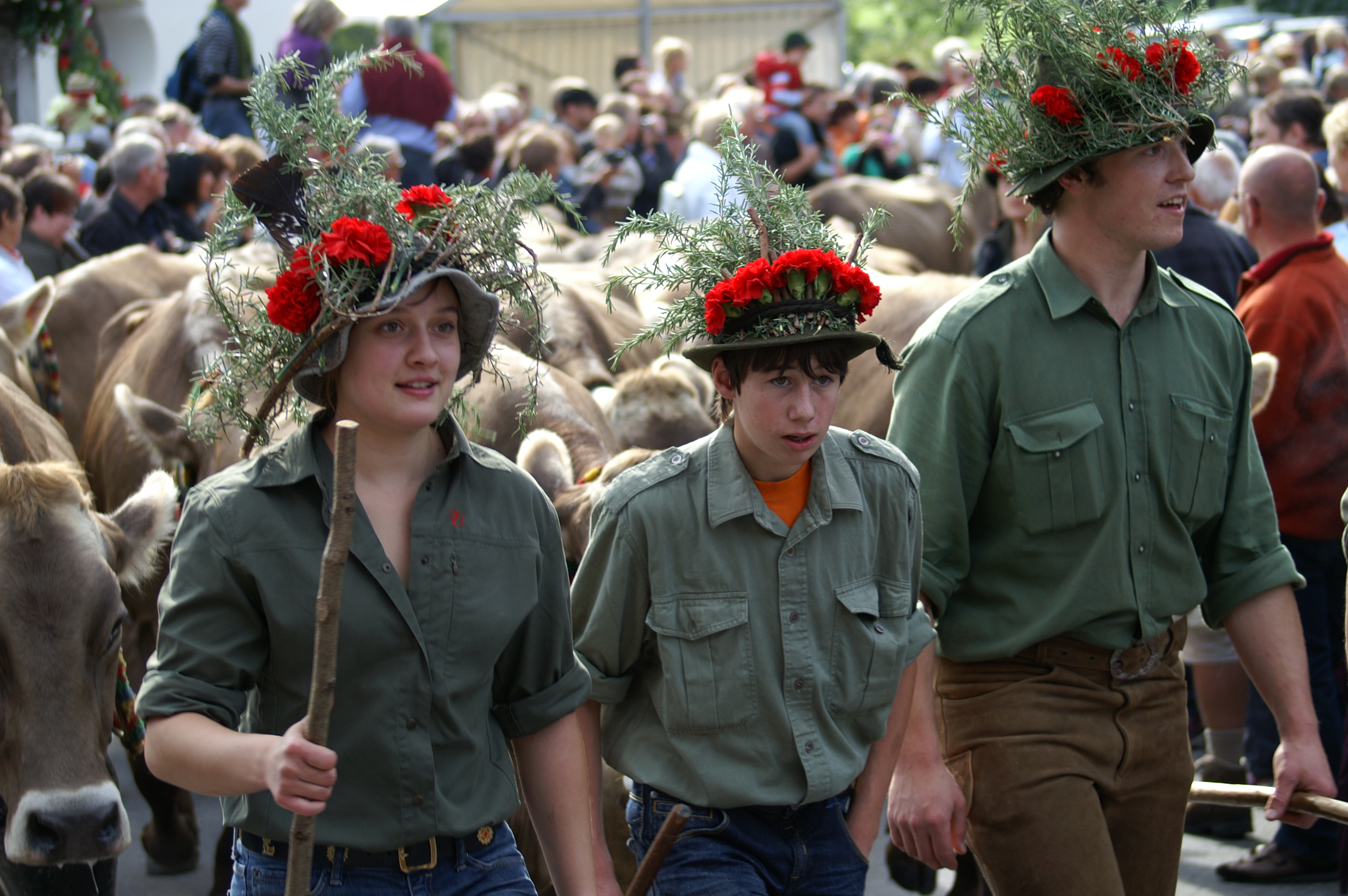
Almabtrieb in Schwarzenberg

- The Käsestraße Bregenzerwald is a joint venture between farmers, milk farmers, artisans, gastronomers, and various companies in the Bregenz Forest.

=== Events ===
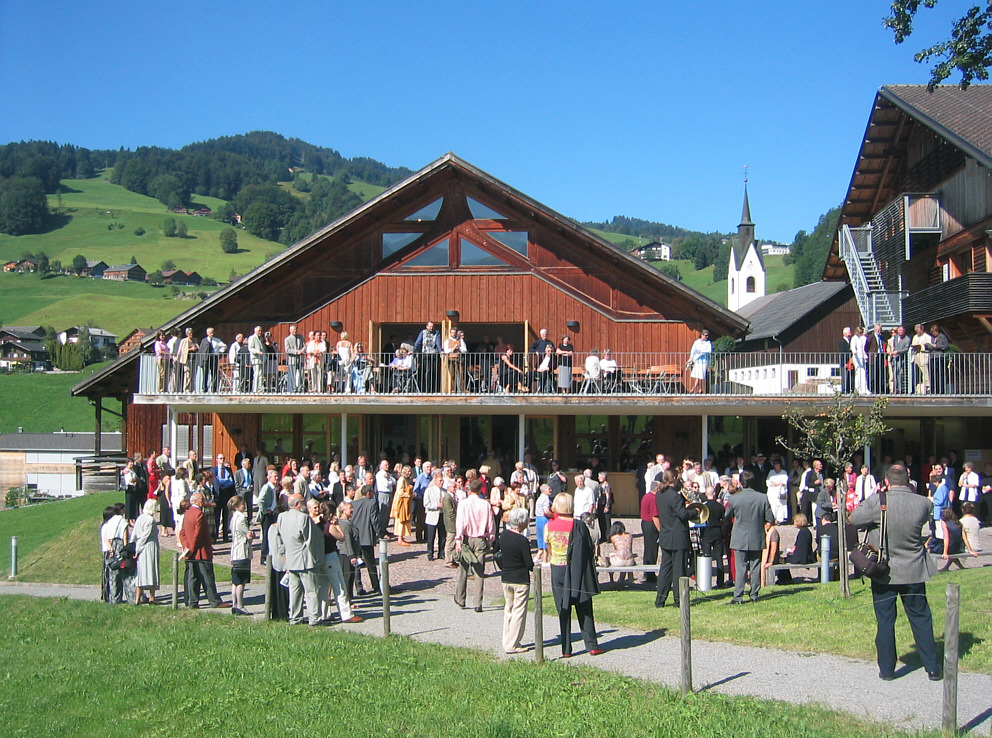
Angelika-Kauffmann-Saal during the Schubertiade

The Schubertiade Vorarlberg takes place every summer. It is a song and chamber-music festival, which focuses on compositions that are usually not played at larger concerts, mostly composed by Franz Schubert.
