= Joseph von Spaun =

Austrian nobleman (1788–1865)

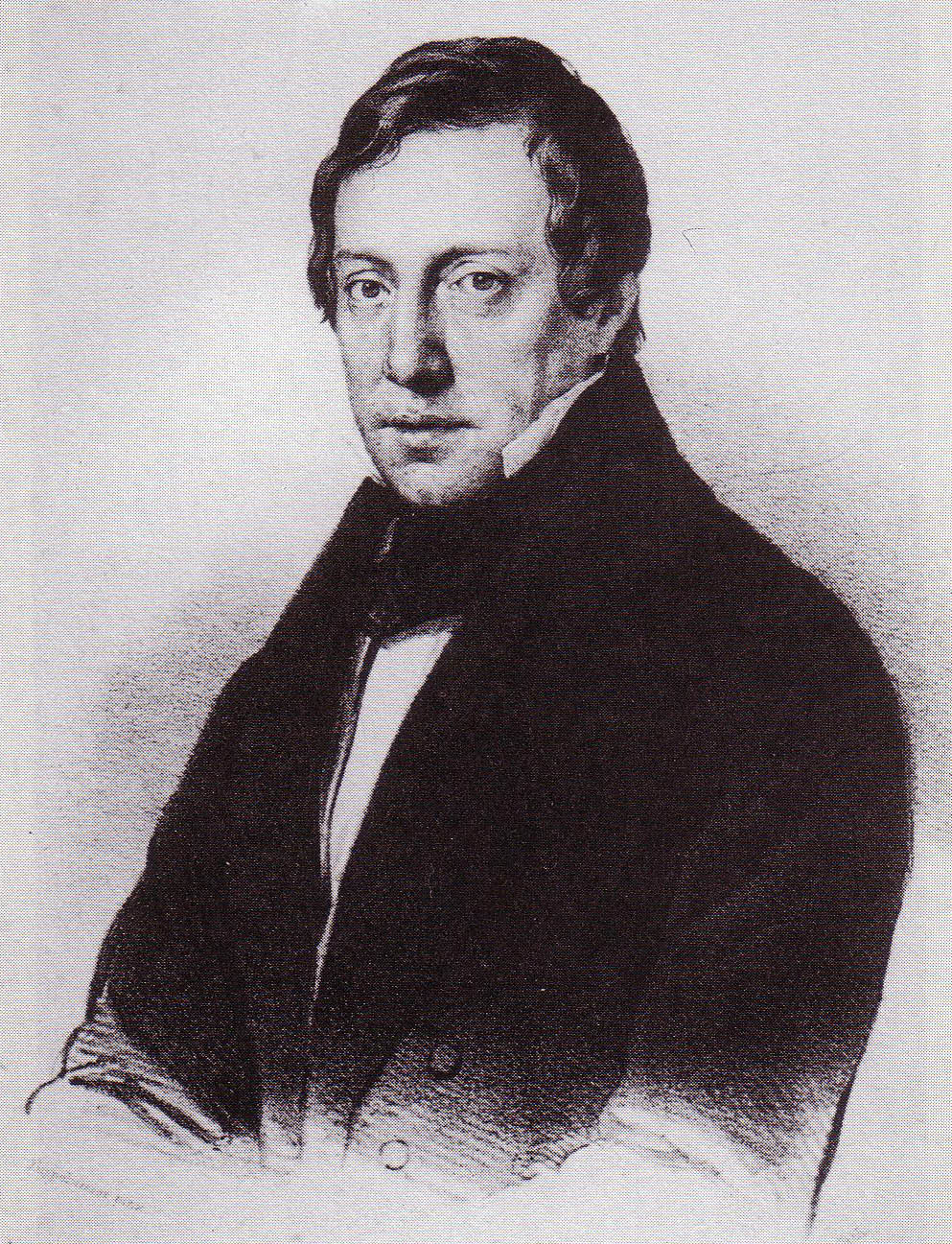
Joseph von Spaun

Joseph Freiherr von Spaun (November 11, 1788 – November 25, 1865) was an Austrian nobleman, an Imperial and Royal Councillor, lottery director, and honorary citizen of Vienna and Cieszyn. He is best known for his friendship with the composer Franz Schubert.

== Family ==
Joseph von Spaun came from the Spaun family, originally of Swabian origin first mentioned in documents from 1583-1593 among farmers and yarn spinners Bartholomäus Spaun. The family, originally from Deisenhausen (Günzburg) became wealthy in Linz. He was the son of Franz Xaver Ritter von Spaun (1756-1804) a royal councillor and Imperial State Syndic in Upper Austria and the widow Josepha Steyrer von Riedenburg (1757-1835). His brother was the historian and folklorist Anton Ritter von Spaun (1790-1849).

Spaun married Franziska Roner Edle von Ehrenwert (July 17 1795-Jan 31, 1890), daughter of landholder and military captain Joseph Roner Edler von Ehrenwert on April 14 1828 in Vienna. The son of this union became Admiral Hermann von Spaun.

He was raised to the Austrian nobility on August 25 1859 (Adelsbrief on Nov. 2, 1859), and assumed the title Freiherr (baron).

== Life ==
Spaun studied law from 1806 to 1809 at Vienna University and entered the civil service. At the Vienna seminary he met Franz Schubert, eight years younger than himself, and they developed a lifelong friendship. Spaun supported Schubert financially, enabling the young composer to attend the opera and theater, and providing him with a supply of music paper. The patronage lasted to the end of Schubert's life, and Spaun hosted the final Schubertiade on January 28, 1828.

Spaun was made an honorary citizen of Vienna on May 18, 1841.
