= Joseph Sonnleithner =

Austrian librettist, theater director, archivist, court agent, and councillor

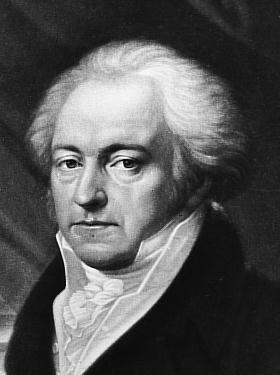
- Joseph Sonnleithner, librettist of Beethoven's "Fidelio"
- Born: Joseph Ferdinand Sonnleithner; 3 March 1766; Vienna
- Died: 26 December 1835 (aged 69); Vienna
- Occupations: Court agent; librettist; archivist
- Known for: Joseph Haydn and Ludwig van Beethoven's friend

Joseph Ferdinand Sonnleithner (3 March 1766 – 26 December 1835) was an Austrian court agent, councillor, librettist, theater director, and archivist. He was the son of Christoph Sonnleithner, brother of Ignaz von Sonnleithner and uncle of Franz Grillparzer and Leopold von Sonnleithner. He was a personal friend of Ludwig van Beethoven, and he wrote numerous librettos, among them, Beethoven's stage opera Fidelio, Faniska by Luigi Cherubini and Agnes Sorel by Adalbert Gyrowetz.

== Life ==
Sonnleithner began working for the Viennese court in 1787, first at Joseph II's private office and later in the chancellery. From 1796 he published the Wiener Theater-Almanach, and in 1802 he became partner in the Kunst und Industrie-Comptoir publishing house. For a short period from February to August 1804 he served as artistic director of the Theater an der Wien, and from 1804 to 1814 as secretary of court theaters in Vienna. He was also a leading figure in Viennese musical life in the first decades of the nineteenth century and consequently one of the founders of the Gesellschaft der Musikfreunde, serving as its first secretary starting in 1812. (Note: There are memorial plaques in the entrance hall of the Gesellschaft der Musikverein and at this house's ditch #14. * Jones, David Wyn (1998). The Life of Beethoven. Cambridge University Press. pp. 78–79. ISBN 0-521-56878-1. "Joseph Sonnleithner.")

Sonnleithner was one of the earliest collectors of folksongs and information on their composers in Austria, a project which, though never fulfilled, formed the basis of a new musical encyclopedia. He, his nephew Grillparzer and Franz Schubert were close friends. For his treasured collection of oil paintings from the Baroque period on, which is now kept in the Gesellschaft der Musikfreunde, he also commissioned a special portrait of Schubert from the artist Anton Depauly. (Note: "A very deserving and funny man," said Joseph Haydn to Johann Peter Salomon about Sonnleithner on 15 May 1799.)

== Sources ==
- Eusebius Mandyczewski (2010). "Sonnleithner". Neue Deutsche Biographie (in German). Vol. 24. Berlin: Duncker & Humblot. pp. 581–582. (full text online).
- Anna Schirlbauer: "Joseph Sonnleithners Sammlung in der Portraitgalerie der Gesellschaft der Musikfreunde in Wien. Neue Erkenntnisse über ihren Begründer, ihre Bilder und Maler. Mit Abschnitten über die Maler Mähler, Kupelwieser und Depauly und Details über die Entstehung der Sammlung." In: Wiener Geschichtsblätter 62 (2007), H. 1, S. 29–64.
- A. Brandtner: "Sonnleithner Joseph Ferdinand". In: Österreichisches Biographisches Lexikon 1815–1950 (ÖBL). Vol. 12, Austrian Academy of Sciences, Vienna 2005, ISBN 3-7001-3580-7, p. 426.
