= Christoph Sonnleithner =

Austrian jurist and composer

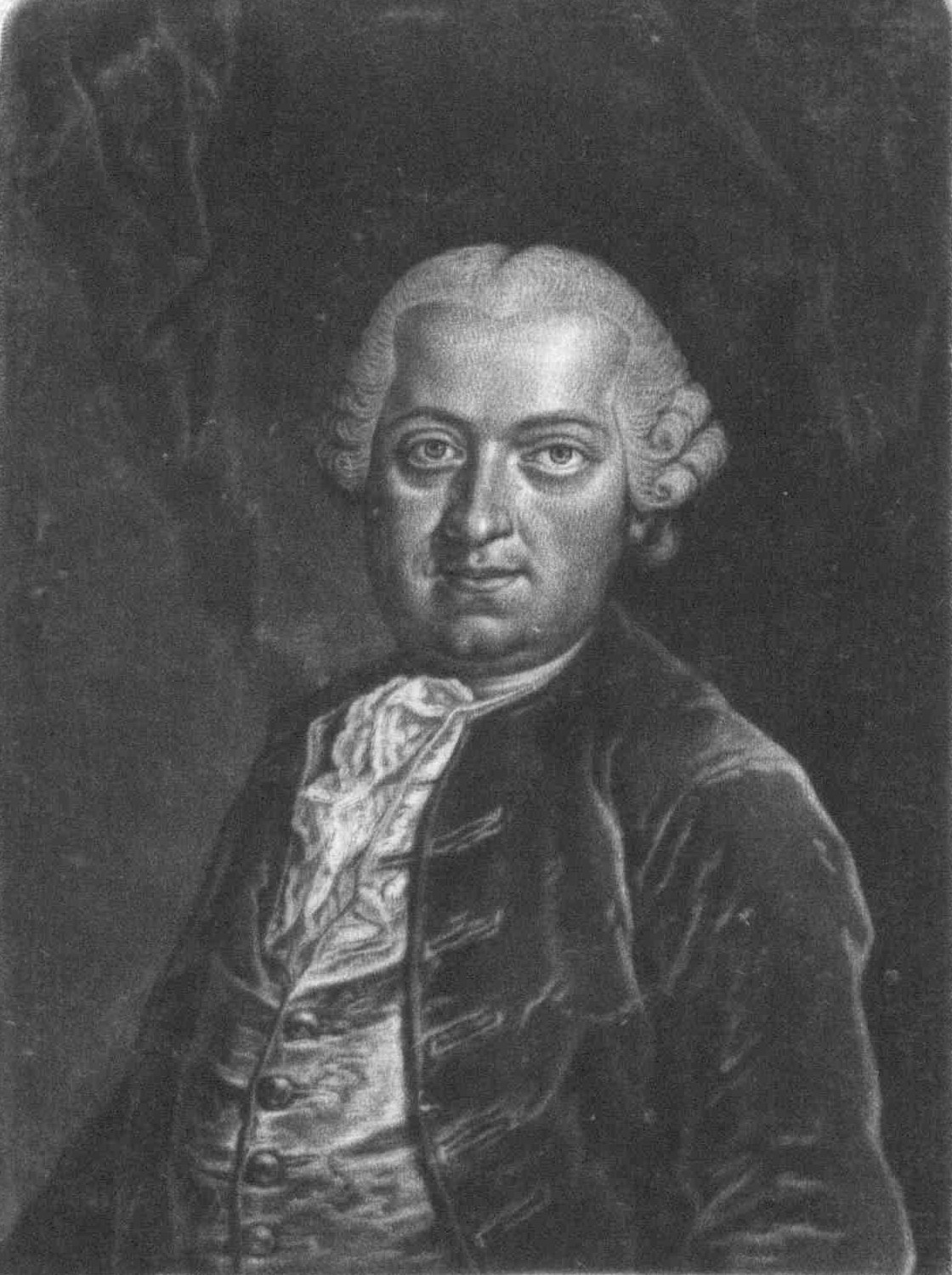
- Portrait of Christoph Sonnleithner.
- Born: Christoph Sonnleithner; Szeged, Hungary
- Died: Vienna
- Occupations: Solicitor, Composer

Christoph Sonnleithner (28 May 1734 in Szeged, Hungary – 25 December 1786 in Vienna, Austria) was an Austrian jurist and composer. He was the father of Ignaz von Sonnleithner and Joseph Sonnleithner. His daughter Anna was the mother of Franz Grillparzer.

== Life ==
Sonnleithner studied legal science at the University of Vienna where he graduated with a doctorate. Later he was given work as a solicitor in the service of the princely House of Esterházy being his employer Prince Paul II Anton Esterházy de Galantha. Sonnleithner was appointed as Dean of the Juridical Faculty at the University of Vienna, and had thus the office of the court judge of the Scottish Abbey, the College of the Scots.

As a composer, Sonnleithner was in contact with Joseph Haydn and Wolfgang Amadeus Mozart. He composed 36 string quartets, all dedicated to Joseph II, Holy Roman Emperor, several symphonies and various church music. (Note: Sonnleithner composed excellent musical pieces, among them 36 quartets much admired by Austrian Emperor Joseph II, who used to call him his favorite composer, and a few symphonies played by his friend Franz Bernhard Ritter von Kees and his orchestra. * Grove, Sir George (2010). A Dictionary of Music and Musicians (A. D. 1450-1889), Vol. 3 of 4 (Classic Reprint). Forgotten Books. p. 632. ISBN 978-1-4400-4525-7.)

== Additional information ==
=== Sources ===
- Eusebius Mandyczewski (2010). "Sonnleithner". Neue Deutsche Biographie (in German). Vol. 24. Berlin: Duncker & Humblot. pp. 581–582. (full text online).
