= Leopold von Sonnleithner =

Austrian lawyer (1797–1873)

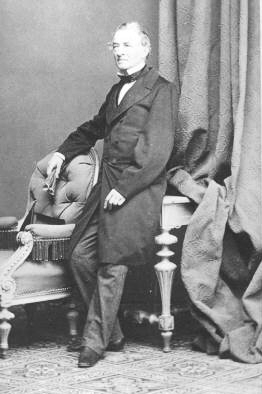
- Leopold von Sonnleithner
- Born: Leopold Andreas Ignaz Sonnleithner; 15 November 1797; Vienna, Habsburg empire
- Died: 3 March 1873 (aged 75); Vienna, Austria-Hungary
- Other name: Leopold Edler von Sonnleithner
- Occupations: Lawyer, composer
- Known for: Friend and patron of Viennese composers

Leopold Andreas Ignaz Sonnleithner (from 1828 Leopold Edler von Sonnleithner; 15 November 1797 – 3 March 1873) was an Austrian lawyer and a well-known personality of the Viennese Classical music scene. He was a friend and patron of Ludwig van Beethoven, Franz Schubert, Franz Grillparzer, and Carl Czerny.

== Family ==
Leopold von Sonnleithner was a grandson of the composer Christoph Sonnleithner, and son of the lawyer Ignaz von Sonnleithner. Leopold married Louise Augusta Gosmar (1803–1850), a native of Hamburg, on 6 May 1828.

== Life ==
Sonnleithner was born on 15 November 1797 in Vienna. He received his doctorate of law on 4 May 1819 in Vienna. He was a personal friend and patron of the Viennese composers Ludwig van Beethoven, Franz Schubert and his cousins, the playwright Franz Grillparzer (1791–1872), and Carl Czerny. Schubert dedicated his musical setting of Grillparzer's Serenade "Hesitantly Quiet" (D921) to Sonnleithner's wife Louise. Sonnleithner handled Carl Czerny's will.

Sonnleithner was buried at a cemetery in the Viennese district of Margareten in 1873.
